= Cynanthropy =

Delusion of real persons that they are dogs

Cynanthropy (sometimes spelled kynanthropy; from Ancient Greek: κύων/kúōn, 'dog' + ἄνθρωπος/ánthrōpos, 'man; human') is, in psychiatry, the pathological delusion of real persons that they are dogs and in anthropology and folklore, the supposed magical practice of shape-shifting alternately between dog and human forms, or the possession of combined canine and human anatomical features, a form of therianthropy.

The Greeks spoke of cynanthropy (kyon, dog). The term existed by at least 1901, when it was applied to myths from China about humans turning into dogs, dogs becoming people, and sexual relations between humans and canines. After lycanthropy, cynanthropy is the best known term for a specific variety of therianthropy.

Anthropologist David Gordon White called Central Asia the "vortex of cynanthropy" because races of dog-men were habitually placed there by ancient writers. Hindu mythology puts races of "Dog Cookers" to the far north of India, the Chinese placed the "Dog Jung" and other human/canine barbarians to the extreme west, and European legends frequently put the dog men called Cynocephali in unmapped regions to the east. Some of these races were described as humans with dog heads, others as canine shapeshifters.

The weredog or cynanthrope is also known in Timor. It is described as a human/canine shapeshifter who is also capable of transforming other people into animals against their wills. These transformations are usually into prey animals such as goats, so that the cynanthrope can devour them without discovery of the crime.

== See also ==
- Clinical lycanthropy
- Coyote (Navajo mythology)
- Cynocephaly
- Kitsune
- Otherkin
- Shapeshifting
- Skin-walker
- Therianthropy
- Were
- Werecat
- Werehyena
- Werejaguar
- Werewolf
