= Werewoman =

Woman who has taken the form of an animal

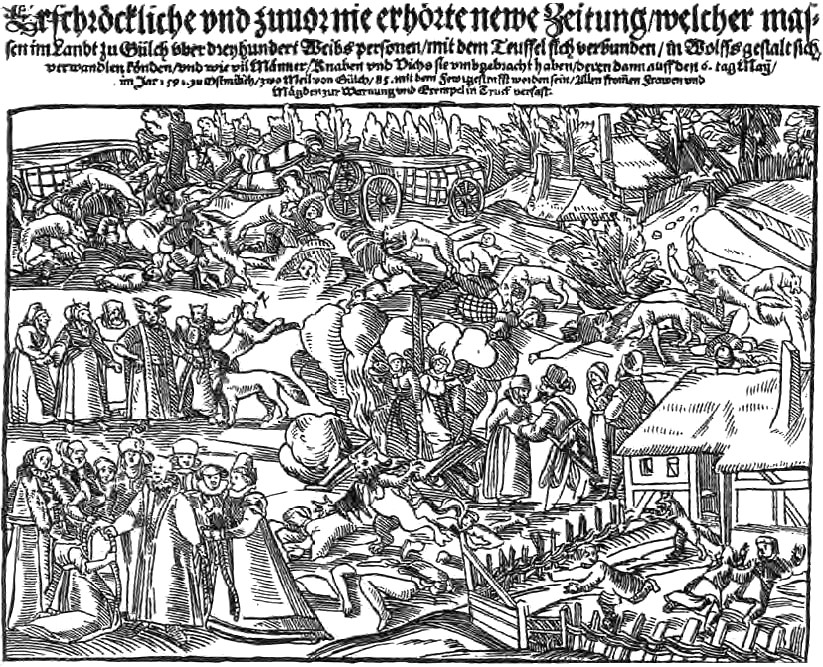
Male and female werewolves being executed in a broadside, Werewolves from Jülich, printed by Georg Kress, 1591.

In mythology and literature, a werewoman or were-woman is a woman who has taken the form of an animal through a process of therianthropy. The use of the word "were" refers to the ability to shape-shift but is, taken literally, a contradiction in terms since in Old English the word "wer" means man. This would mean it literally translates to "man-woman".

Werewomen are reported in antiquity and in more recent African folklore, where the phenomenon is sometimes associated with witchcraft, though sources often do not state the animal into which the woman has transformed and it is not necessarily a wolf. In areas where wolves do not exist, other fierce animals may take their place, for instance leopards or hyenas in Africa. Werewomen are distinctive as most legends of lycanthropy involve men, though the process is not restricted solely to men, and if they involve women it is usually in the role of a victim.

== Historical accounts ==
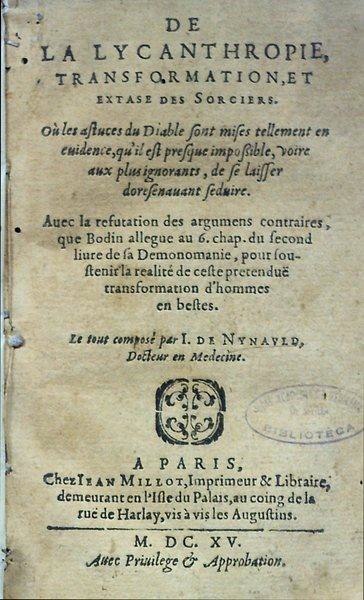
The title page of De la lycanthropie, transformation et extase des sorciers (1615) by Jean de Nynauld.

In sixth-century Lebanon, villages attacked by werewomen were advised by a local holy man to have themselves baptised and to take collective ritual preventive measures.

A 1591 broadside, Werewolves of Jurich, printed by Georg Kress, tells the story of the terrorising of the town of Jurich by hundreds of werewolves and depicts a number of male and female werewolves being executed, including some apparently wearing nun's veils.

In 1601, French jurist Henry Boguet reported in Discours exécrable des Sorciers (An Examen of Witches) the case of a woodsman who had been attacked by a wolf but had managed to cut off its paw. Upon escape, the man examined the paw and found it had turned into a woman's hand, which he recognised from the ring was the hand of his wife. She was burned alive.

Lewis Spence, in his 1920 An Encyclopaedia of Occultism, recorded that in Armenia it was thought that a demon would present himself to a sinful woman and command her to wear a wolf's skin, after donning which she would spend seven years as a wolf during the night, devouring her own and other children and acting generally as a wild beast until the morning when she would resume her human form.

In a legend from Liberia, a lazy husband asks his wife to use her shape-shifting powers to change into a leopard and capture food in order to save him the trouble of hunting. After the wife transforms, she terrorizes her husband with her claws and teeth until he agrees to start hunting again.

== Witchcraft ==
In the early modern world, there was not always a clear separation between the idea of the werewolf and the witch. A werewolf could be male or female but was not necessarily a witch. Some witches, however, could transform themselves into dogs or wolves or enchant those animals, and witch trials sometimes mention witches riding wolves. A werewolf might become so by using a magic ointment and this was similar to the ointment that witches were reputed to use to allow flight. Jean de Nynauld discussed werewolf magic ointments in his 1615 book, though he saw lycanthropy as a form of mental illness rather than a form of magic and believed that the ointments contained hallucinogenic compounds that caused an out of body experience which reinforced the lycanthropic delusion.

In late nineteenth century Asaba, in the Igbo Region of what is now Nigeria, witches were often thought to be werewomen, and a close connection was thought to exist between all women and witchcraft. In one story a mother tries to prevent her son leaving home by transforming herself into a werewoman and is only revealed when the son challenges the "monster or spirit" to reveal its true identity as a human being.

== In LGBT culture ==
The cover of Tales of the WereWoman! by Tiffany Bell. The cover contains the teaser "Every full moon he becomes a sex-starved nympho!"

In LGBT slang, the term werewoman has a different meaning of a man who transforms into a woman at night, or possibly once a month on a full Moon. The theme is the subject of fantasy fiction on the internet in stories such as Curse of the Were-Woman: A transformation tale by Dawn Carrington, Gynothrope and Shifters by Maxwell Avoi, and similar stories which together form a genre described as "Reluctant Gender Transformation" or "Gender Transformation Erotica". Such transformations are normally portrayed as forced, either through natural forces such as the phases of the Moon or through magic. In the case of the Carrington story, the actions of a supernatural succubus cause the transformation. The transformation is also forced in the graphic novels Curse of the Were-Woman, written by Jason M. Burns and illustrated by Christopher Provencher, where an inveterate womanizer is cursed by an angry jilted lover and witch, causing him to become a woman at night.

== In fiction as werewolves ==
Werewomen as wolves have appeared in modern popular fiction and the idea was also used in Victorian fiction to explore the issue of women's rights and women's sexuality in, for instance, The Were-Wolf by Clemence Housman, and works by Frederick Marryat. The 1938 short story "Werewoman" by C. L. Moore also dealt with the subject. In comics, Marvel published an edition of their Conan the Barbarian comic in 1974 titled The Warrior and the Were-Woman! while a 1976 comic featured a character named Tigra the Were-woman. The 2012 horror-thriller debut novel by Brian McGreevy Hemlock Grove and the subsequent TV show adaptation also feature a werewolf girl called Christina Wendall.

== See also ==
- Werecat
- Werehyena
- Werejaguar
- Wererat
- Werewolf
