= Were =

Archaic term for an adult male human

Were and wer are archaic terms for adult male humans and were often used for alliteration with wife as "were and wife" in Germanic-speaking cultures (Old English: wer, Old Dutch: wer, Gothic: waír, Old Frisian: wer, Old Saxon: wer, Old High German: wer, Old Norse: verr).

In Anglo-Saxon law wer was the value of a man's life. He could be required to pay his wer to the king as a penalty for crime. If he was murdered then his relatives were entitled to his wergild as compensation from the murderer.

== Etymology and usage ==
The word has cognates in various other languages, for example, Latin vir (as in virility) and Gaelic fear (plural fir as in Fir Bolg) both mean a male human.

It is likely that wer forms part of a compound word in werewolf (man-wolf), although there are other proposed etymologies. In folklore and fantasy fiction, were- is often prefixed to an animal name to indicate a therianthropic figure or shapeshifter (e.g. "were-boar"). Hyphenation used to be mandatory, but is now commonly dropped, as in werecat and wererat. There is no attested counterpart wifwylf or wyfwylf .

== See also ==
- List of common false etymologies of English words#Other for a longer discussion of wer, wyf, and mann
- Man (word)
- For shapeshifters:
  - Cynanthropy
  - Lycanthropy (disambiguation)
  - Mannaz
  - Skin-walker
  - Therianthropy
  - Werecat
  - Werehyena
  - Werejaguar
  - Werewolf
