= Werejaguar =

Supernatural entity in Olmec mythology

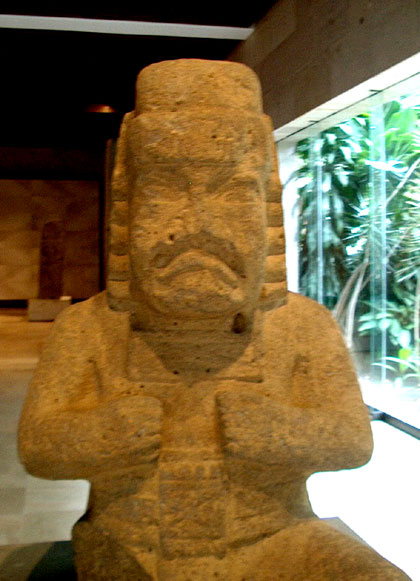
A stone Olmec werejaguar, showing common werejaguar characteristics including a downturned mouth, almond-shaped eyes, pleated ears, a headdress with headband, and a crossed-bars icon on the chest

The werejaguar was both an Olmec motif and a supernatural entity, perhaps a deity.

The werejaguar motif is characterized by almond-shaped eyes, a downturned open mouth, and a cleft head. It appears widely in the Olmec archaeological record, and in many cases, under the principle of pars pro toto, the werejaguar motif represents the werejaguar supernatural. The werejaguar supernatural incorporates the werejaguar motif as well as other features, although various academics define the werejaguar supernatural differently. The werejaguar supernatural was once considered to be the primary deity of the Olmec culture but is now thought to be only one of many.

Originally, many scholars believed that the werejaguar was tied to a myth concerning a copulation between a jaguar and a woman. Although this hypothesis is still recognized as viable by many researchers, other explanations for the werejaguar motif have since been put forward, several questioning whether the motif actually represents a jaguar at all.

The term is derived from Old English were, meaning "man", and jaguar, a large member of the cat family in the Olmec heartland, on analogy with werewolf.

== Description ==
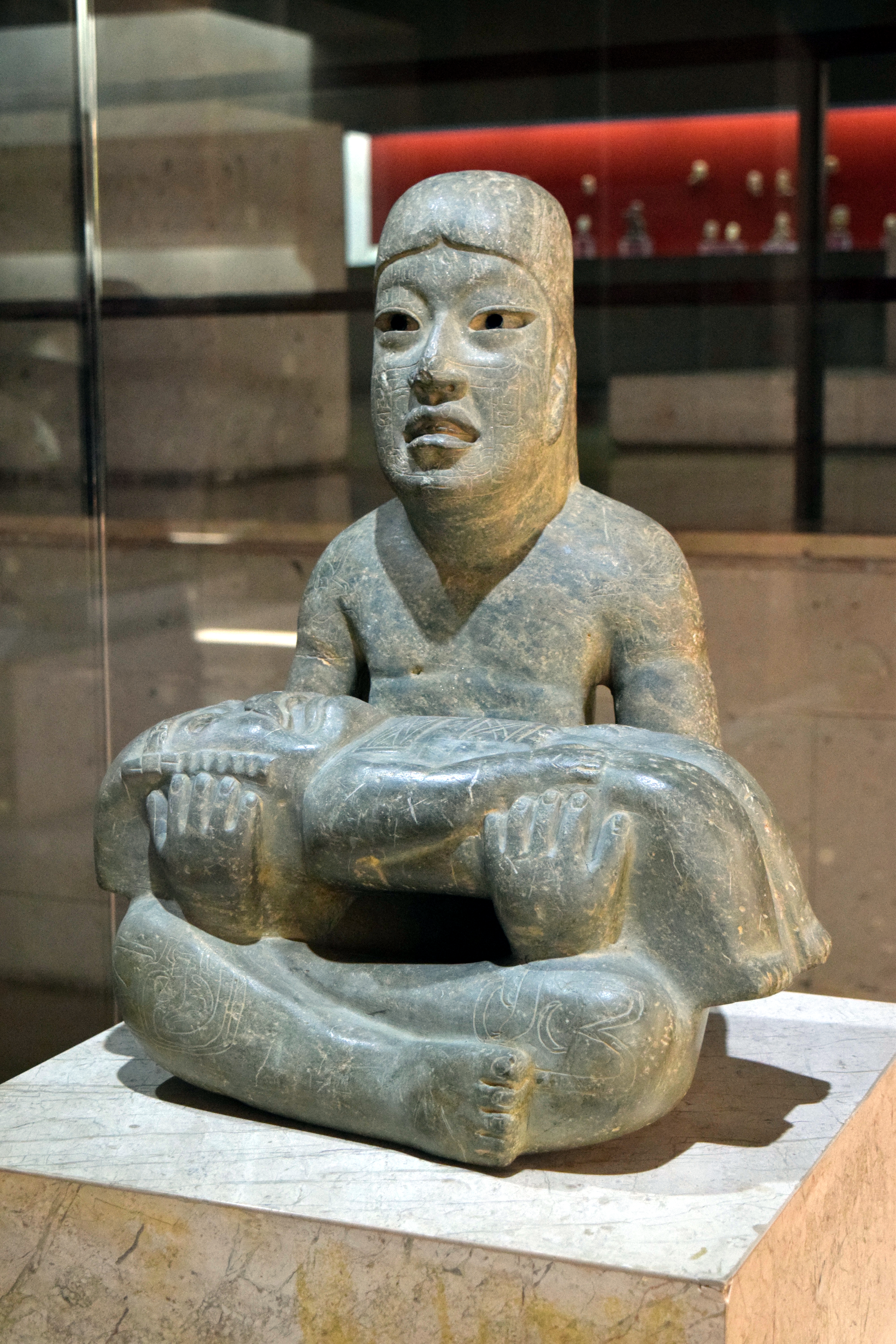
Las Limas Monument 1, showing an adolescent "presenting" a werejaguar infant. Profiles of four other supernaturals are incised on the adolescent's shoulders and knees.

=== Werejaguar motif ===
The basic werejaguar motif combines a cleft head, slanting almond-shaped eyes with round irises, and a downturned open mouth with a flared upper lip and toothless gums. This motif was first described in print by Marshall Saville in 1929 and expanded upon by artist and archaeologist Miguel Covarrubias in his 1946 and 1957 books. In this latter book, Indian Art of Mexico & Central America, Covarrubias included a family tree showing the "jaguar mask" as ancestral to all (later) Mesoamerican rain gods.

At about this time, in 1955, Matthew Stirling set forward what has since become known as the Stirling Hypothesis, proposing that the werejaguar was the outcome of a mating between a jaguar and a woman.

In response to this groundwork, the werejaguar became the reigning linchpin of Olmec iconography. Nearly any representation showing a downturned mouth or cleft head was described as a "werejaguar". A major 1965 Olmec-oriented exhibition was entitled "The Jaguar's Children" and referred to the werejaguar as "the divine power of the Olmec civilization".

This paradigm was undermined, however, by the discovery that same year of Las Limas Monument 1, a greenstone sculpture that displayed not only a werejaguar baby, but four other supernaturals, each of whom had a cleft head. Based on analyses of this sculpture, in 1976, Peter David Joralemon proposed definitions for eight Olmec supernaturals, each characterised by specific iconographic combinations.

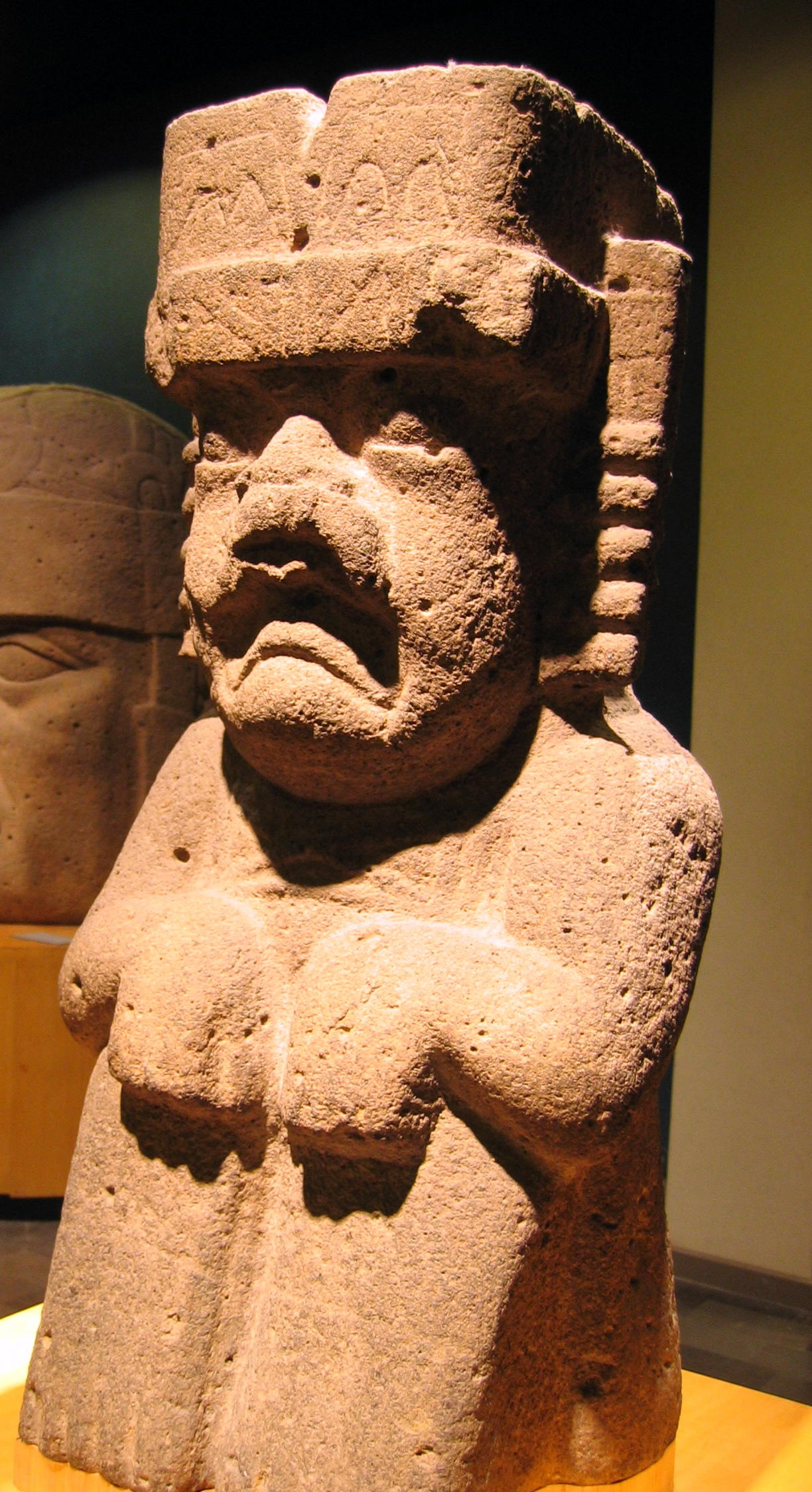
Monument 52 from San Lorenzo Tenochtitlan, showing a classic werejaguar figure. The long deep groove carved into the back of this sculpture indicates it was part of the drainage system, associating the werejaguar with rain and water.

=== Werejaguar as a rain deity ===
Through subsequent research, it became apparent that not every cleft head nor every downturned mouth represented a werejaguar. Some researchers have therefore refined the werejaguar supernatural, specifically equating it with the Olmec rain deity, a proposition that artist, archaeologist, and ethnographer Miguel Covarrubias had made as early as 1946 in Mexico South.

The Olmec rain supernatural (or deity) not only displays the characteristic almond-shaped eyes, cleft head, and downturned mouth—that is, the werejaguar motif—but has several other defining attributes, including a headband and a headdress, the latter usually cleft. The headband is often divided horizontally and decorated with regularly spaced ornaments. In addition to, or often as an extension of, the headdress, the supernatural also sports earbars (often pleated) running down the sides of its face, and a "crossed-bars" icon on the chest and/or navel.

=== Beyond the term "werejaguar" ===
Some academics have even attempted to move away from the term "werejaguar". For example, in his 1996 monograph, rather than "werejaguar", Anatole Pohorilenko uses the term "composite anthropomorph". In their 1993 book, Miller and Taube state that:

An overarching [werejaguar] theory cannot explain the diversity and complexity of Olmec supernaturals. Only one, the Rain Baby, clearly seems to be a human-jaguar blend.

== Depictions ==
Although they are "strangely absent" from ceramics, three-dimensional representations of the Olmec werejaguar supernatural appear in a wide variety of stonework, from small greenstone figurines (see this 9 cm figurine) to basalt statues (such as San Lorenzo Monument 52) to larger monuments (see lead photo).

Inert werejaguar babies are often shown held by stoic adults, as if the infant were being presented. This scene is depicted in a wide range of materials, from small portable carvings (see photo below) to nearly life-size greenstone statuettes, to multi-tonne altars (see photo of Altar 5 front here), although it is not known with any clarity what this act represents.

Two-dimensional representations of the werejaguar were incised onto greenstone celts, painted on pottery, and even carved onto four multi-tonne monoliths at Teopantecuanitlan (see drawing). Lively werejaguar babies are depicted in bas-relief on the sides of La Venta Altar 5 (see photo below).

According to archaeologist Peter Furst, werejaguar figurines were likely used as household gods for many people and as spirit helpers or familiars for priests or shamans, aiding in transformative acts and other rituals.

== Origins ==
As the major predator of Mesoamerica, the jaguar was revered by pre-Columbian societies, and adoption of jaguar motifs by the ruling elite was used to reinforce or validate leadership. However, this does not explain the werejaguar motif in and of itself, and the possible origins of the motif have engaged scholars for over a half century.

=== The Stirling hypothesis ===
Matthew Stirling, who made many of the initial Olmec discoveries in the mid-20th century, proposed that the werejaguar motif was derived from the story of copulation between a male jaguar and a female human, largely based on:

- Potrero Nuevo Monument 3,
- Tenochititlán Monument 1,
- Laguna de los Cerros Monument 20, and
- Murals from Chalcatzingo.

This so-called Stirling hypothesis won guarded support from later archaeologists, including Michael D. Coe. Further analysis of these sculptures by scholars including Whitney Davis, Carolyn Tate, Carson Murdy, and Peter Furst, however, have cast doubt on this hypothesis, instead proposing alternatives to explain the jaguar characteristics.

=== Jaguar as victor ===
In his 1978 article, Whitney Davis suggests that the so-called depictions of human-jaguar copulation on monuments are instead the beginnings of a jaguar cult or are representative of conquest in battle rather than a sexual conquest. Rather than viewing the people and jaguar-figures in sexual situations, Davis sees the jaguar, or man in jaguar pelts, as an aggressor towards a defeated opponent. Most of the figures in the reliefs and monuments are clothed in loincloths, which would negate copulation, and Davis believes those that are naked appear dead or dying rather than in a sexual posture. It is not uncommon to see unclothed human figures as representative of dead captives or opponents in battle, as in the danzantes of Monte Albán.

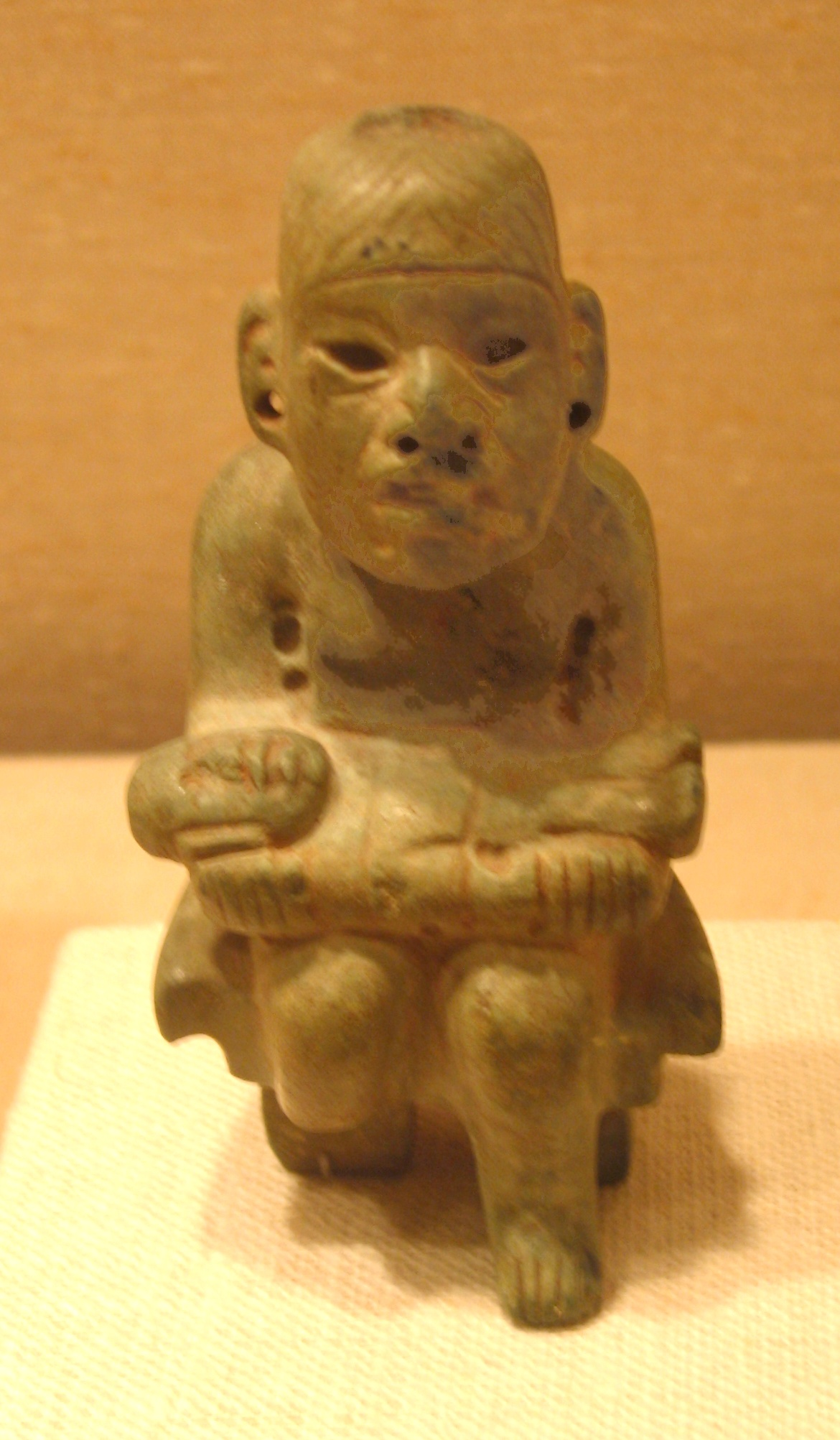
The "presentation" of an inert werejaguar baby is a common theme in Olmec art. Compare this with Las Limas Monument 1 above.

=== Genetic defects ===
Even before Davis questioned the idea of a belief system centering on human-jaguar copulation, scholars such as Michael Coe looked for biological causes for the fleshy lips, cleft head, and toothless mouths that make up the werejaguar motif. Genetic abnormalities such as Down syndrome and spina bifida have been common explanations. People afflicted with spina bifida in particular present developmental defects that coincide with the werejaguar characteristics. One such condition is encephaloceles, which among other things, can cause separation of the cranial sutures and result in a depression, or cleft, in the head. Cranium bifidum can produce similar results. In addition, there is a higher chance of these conditions occurring within the same family than randomly throughout the population, and there might have been considerable inbreeding among the elite. If children born with this affliction were seen as divine or special in some way, multiple births of affected children within a family or familial line would have reinforced that family's political and religious power.

=== Werejaguar as toad ===
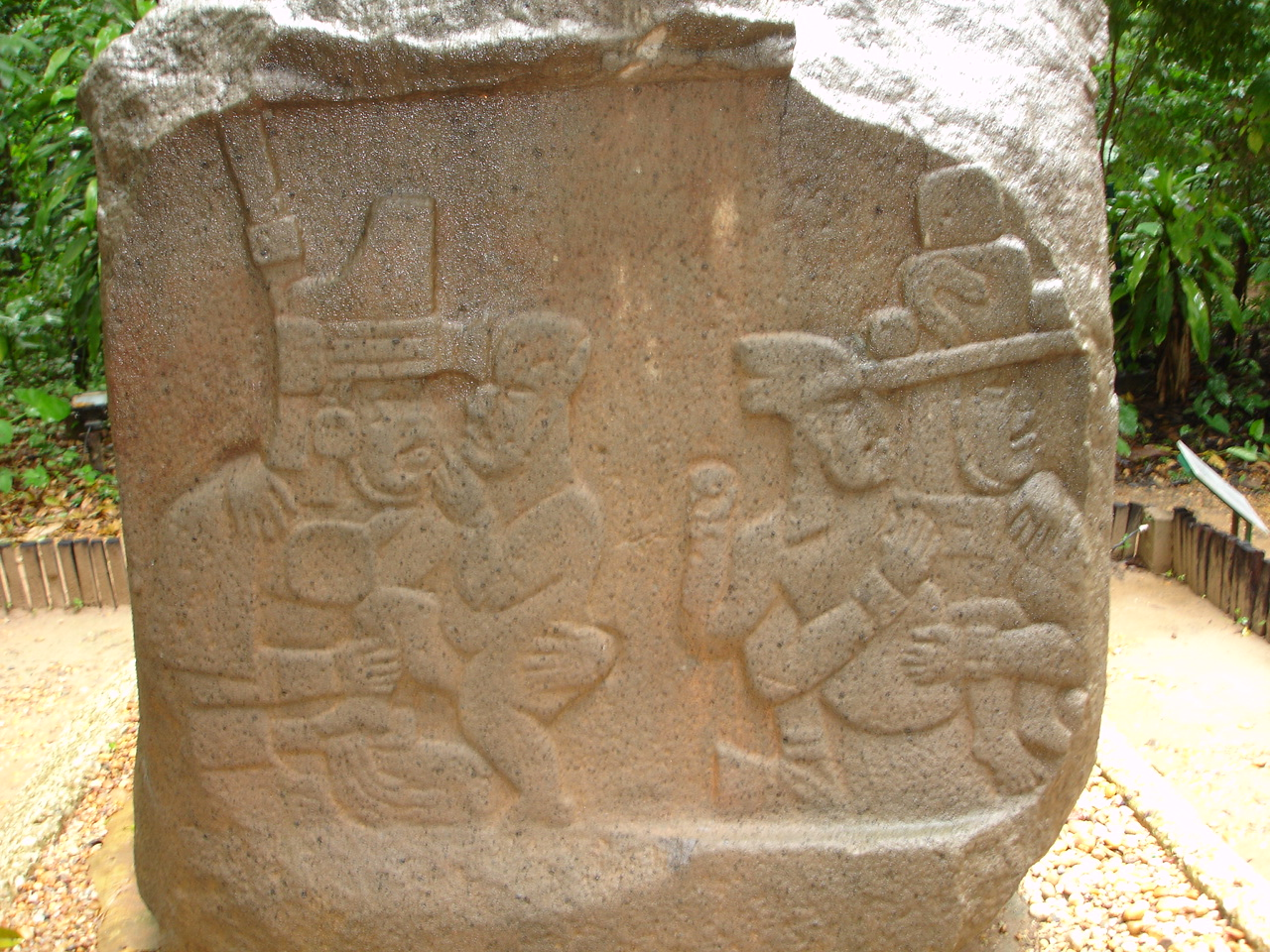
Two lively werejaguar babies on the left side of La Venta Altar 5. The two werejaguars depicted on Altar 5 at La Venta as being carried out from a niche or cave—places often associated with the emergence of human beings—may be mythic hero twins essential to Olmec mythology and perhaps forerunners of the Maya Hero Twins.

Peter Furst, among others, has suggested that the werejaguar actually represents a variety of native toad, specifically "an anthropomorphically conceived toad with jaguar characteristics".

Species of toad that are commonly found in Mesoamerica, like Bufo marinus or Bufo valliceps, have the pronounced cleft in the head and, like all toads, have a fleshy mouth with toothless gums. These species of toad are known to have ceremonial and hallucinogenic properties for many cultures of Mesoamerica. Skeletal remains of these species, particularly Bufo marinus, have been found at several archaeological sites in Mesoamerica including Olmec ceremonial centers. These species of toads have inherent symbolic power in their metamorphic life cycle, their fertility, their hallucinogenic venom, and especially their skin-shedding.

Those werejaguar representations that have fangs commonly attributed as jaguar fangs can also be explained as toad-like. Several times a year, mature toads shed their skin. As the old skin is shed, the toad will eat it. As the skin is eaten, it hangs out of the toad's mouth and closely resembles the fangs of the werejaguar. The process of regeneration could have symbolised death and rebirth, with all its attendant religious implications.

=== Werejaguar as harpy eagle ===
The werejaguar can also be represented as a harpy eagle. Peter Furst argues that the werejaguar's equivalent in the sky is the harpy eagle. Both are powerful creatures associated with ancient Olmec shamanic transformation. Furst makes this conclusion based upon iconographic evidence and the fact that harpy eagles are also apex predators.

== See also ==
- Naguals, later Mesoamerican mythical shape-shifters
- North American jaguar
- Skin-walker
- Therianthropy
- Were
- Werecat
- Werehyena
- Wererat
- Werewolf
