= Mexican mythology =

Mexican mythology may refer to:

- Aztec mythology
- Maya mythology
- Olmec religion

== See also ==
- Mesoamerican religion
