= Lycanthrope (disambiguation) =

A lycanthrope or werewolf is a mythological creature.

Lycanthrope may also refer to:

- "Lycanthrope" (song), a song by +44 from When Your Heart Stops Beating
- Lycanthropes (Chill), an accessory book for the role-playing game Chill

== See also ==
- Lycanthropy (disambiguation)
- Lycan (disambiguation)
- Lycanthropus, a 1962 Italian horror film
- Licántropo, a 1996 Spanish horror film
