= Lycaon =

Lycaon may refer to:

== Mythology ==
- Lycaon (mythology), several figures from Greek mythology, including:
  - Lycaon (son of Priam), son of King Priam of Troy by Laothoe
  - Lycaon (king of Arcadia), son of Pelasgus and Meliboea, the mythical first king of Arcadia

== Biology ==
- Lycaon (genus), a genus containing one extant species, the African wild dog
- Canis lupus lycaon, the eastern wolf
- Hyponephele lycaon, the dusky meadow brown butterfly

== Other uses ==
- Lycaon (band), a Japanese visual kei rock band
- 4792 Lykaon, an asteroid
- Lycaon Two Wolves, a character in the Marvel Comics universe

== See also ==
- Lycurgus (disambiguation)
- Lycan (disambiguation)
