= Christina Wendall =

Character from Hemlock Grove

Christina Wendall (Wendell on her gravestone) is a character from the 2012 horror-thriller debut novel by American author Brian McGreevy Hemlock Grove: or, The Wise Wolf, later appearing in other works, such as the 2013 American horror thriller television series adaptation of Hemlock Grove of the same name, premiering on Netflix. In the show, Christina's character is played by then 18 year old Australian actress Freya Tingley. Christina is the main antagonist of the show's first season, as well as the antagonist and in-universe writer of the novel. Her character has also been explored in several works.

== Presentation ==
"Christina was thirteen and small for it, a girl with chipped painted nails and skinned knees and a black raven's nest bramble of hair containing a face like a single pale egg. Christina was a girl both young and old for her years; she had never shed the breathless curiosity of a child assembling a taxon- omy of the known universe—what is that? where did that come from? why is that like that and not another way and what is its orientation with every other thing? why? why? why?—and the only person her own age she knew who wanted nothing more when she grew up than to be a Russian novelist. Naturally, she found it imperative to experience these unfathomables firsthand, and she was not disappointed. How perplexing and thrilling, these Rumanceks! Her own parents were both production support analysts for a firm in the city, and that this lifestyle of breezy and pantheistic irreverence existed and was somehow permissi- ble knocked her sideways. She marveled at Peter especially, a real-life Gypsy close to her own age."

— Hemlock Grove: or The Wise Wolf

Christina's age ranges from 12 to 14 in different works, she is 13 in the book and 14 in the show. In the novel, she is described as a girl small for her age, with fair skin and painted chipped nails. Her hair is dark brown in the show, and black in the book. Later on in the story, it turns silvery white like the moon, regardless of the versions, which is part of her transformation into a Vargulf. In her wolf form, Christina is dark at first, but her fur eventually turns white, which is not uncommon with female werewolves in earlier works. In the show werewolves, including Christina's wolf form, are portrayed through a mixture of CGI and wolfdog animal actors. In the show, wolf forms vary in size, from about as large as wolves to the size of a lion. In the novel, Christina's wolf form was described as being tall enough for its head to be level with that of her first victim, a teenage female named Brooke Bluebell.

In the novel and series, Christina has a complex personality and rich internal life. She is described as feeling different from the rest, and portrayed as curious, inquisitive, original, romantic, driven, artistic, shy but direct, both intriguing and intrigued, and possessing a sense of humour. Upon becoming a werewolf, her personality is described to shift to a more rebellious and confident one, but she also becomes jealous and hateful, which is mainly expressed towards promiscuous females. Her personality also shifts for the psychotic. A Vargulf or "Rogue Wolf" is stated to be a physically and mentally unstable werewolf, which does not always consume its prey. The term is associated with Norse folklore and refers to a wolf that is surplus killing. Christina's dream is to become a Russian novelist, and she is depicted as taking long walks in nature to gather materials for her writing. This is precisely what influenced Christina to become a werewoman, as she wished to accumulate more experiences. This topic is discussed in Class Divisions in Serial Television. Christina also has sadistic tendencies; contrary to most depictions of werewolves in modern pop culture, Christina describes her transformation as arousing. In this regard, her character was discussed in Werewolves, Wolves and the Gothic. Her character was further discussed in Horror Television in the Age of Consumption.

According to the book, her parents were both production support analysts for a firm in the city. She is implied to have a crush on Peter Rumancek, a half Romani male. Her "best friends" were the twins Alyssa and Alexa Sworn, but in reality Christina was revealed to despise them. Her parents and grandparents are not named, but merely mentioned.

In "Birth", the last episode of season one of the show, Christina is killed by Shelley Godfrey. Following her death, she resurrects as a pricolici. In the novel, the concept of Eternal Howl is introduced, where she is to retell her story indefinitely. In the show, she pursues Shelley Godfrey and is subsequently ambushed and killed by her again. Christina's destiny afterwards is unknown, she was either released to continue to the franchise's respective afterlife, which has been confirmed to exist in later seasons, or returns from the death again. In support of the later theory, werewolves in the franchise have undergone similar damage without suffering serious consequences, and it is stated that their bodies should be burned after death, which never happened to Christina's. A white wolf was also seen in the last episode of the show, but it is possible that the wolf in question was Peter Rumancek.

== In other media ==
In a 2016 publication by Palgrave Macmillan UK, Christina is discussed from the perspective of cultural and social classes in society. The paper argues her interest towards Peter is a rejection of the upper class. It also assumes Christina chose to turn into a werewolf in order to gain experience, thus securing entry into the class specific role of a novelist.

A 2017 publication by Taylor & Francis discusses Christina's character and role at length, from the perspective of werewolf as portrayed in fiction, including the role of female versus male werewolves.

Similarly, a 2017 publication by University of Wales Press discusses Christina, pointing out how her transformation contrasts to the one of male werewolves in the series, being portrayed as exciting rather than agonizing.

A University Press of Mississippi 2015 publication titled "The Writing Dead", amongst several other papers, also discusses her character and its impact.
