= Lycan =

Lycan may refer to:

- Lycan, Colorado
- An abbreviation for lycanthrope (werewolf) popularized by the Underworld film series

== People with the surname ==
- William Lycan (born 1945), American philosopher

== See also ==
- W Motors Lykan HyperSport, a Lebanese car
- Lycanthrope (disambiguation)
- Lycaon (disambiguation)
- Lichen (disambiguation)
