= Society of Woman Geographers =

Professional organization

The Society of Woman Geographers was established in 1925 at a time when women were excluded from membership in most professional organizations, such as the Explorers Club, who would not admit women until 1981. It is based in Washington, D.C., and has 500 members. Groups are located in Chicago, Florida, Los Angeles, New York, and San Francisco.

The society was organized by four friends, Gertrude Emerson Sen, Marguerite Harrison, Blair Niles and Gertrude Mathews Shelby, to bring together women interested in geography, world exploration, anthropology and related fields. Membership was restricted to women who had "done distinctive work whereby they have added to the world's store of knowledge concerning the countries on which they have specialized, and have published in magazines or in book form a record of their work."

The society's first president was Harriet Chalmers Adams, who held the post from December 1925 until 1933. Marion Stirling Pugh served as its president twice, in 1960–1963 and 1969–1972. Famous members included: historian Mary Ritter Beard, photographer Margaret Bourke-White, novelist Fannie Hurst, writer Marie Ahnighito Peary, mountain climber Annie Smith Peck, anthropologist Margaret Mead, Eleanor Roosevelt, and author Grace Gallatin Seton Thompson.

== Gold Medal ==
The Society's Gold Medal is its highest honor. It is awarded to a member whose "original, innovative, or pioneering contributions are of major significance in understanding the world's cultures and environment." The first gold medal was presented to Amelia Earhart in 1933. The medal was designed by sculptor Lucille Sinclair Douglass, and shows Winged Victory on the arc of the world.

- 2017, Constanza Ceruti, Argentina, High-altitude archaeologist who recovered three preserved Incan mummies from the Andes Mountains.
- 2014, Rebecca Lee Lok-Sze, Hong Kong, Explorer of three Polar Regions-the Arctic, Antarctica, and Mount Everest and the study of climate change and sea level rise.
- 2011, Susan Shaw, American marine toxicologist, who documents harmful impacts of chemicals on the marine environment.
- 2008, Laurie Marker, American conservation biologist, whose non-profit Cheetah Conservation Fund and its International Research and Education Centre in Namibia address threats to the cheetah species, including lack of genetic variation and habitat loss.
- 2005, Tanya Marie Atwater, American geophysicist and marine geologist who studies plate tectonics.
- 1999, Anna Curtenius Roosevelt, American archaeologist, who discovered an unknown prehistoric culture at Painted Rock Cave (Caverna da Pedra Pintada) in the Amazon Basin, challenging theories of human settlement.
- 1996, Pam Flowers, the first person to trek 2,500 miles across the North American Arctic, the longest solo dog sled trek by a woman.
- 1996, Natalie Goodall, American-born biologist, for her studies of marine mammals and other species of Tierra del Fuego, South America.
- 1993, Anne LaBastille, American ornithologist and wildlife ecologist, for conservation work in the Adirondacks and Central America.
- 1993, Kathryn Sullivan, the first American woman to walk in space, during the 1984 Space Shuttle Challenger mission.
- 1990, Sylvia Alice Earle, American marine biologist, for exploration in deep water dives with miniature submarines and submersibles.
- 1990, Jane Goodall, English primatologist and anthropologist, for pioneering field studies of chimpanzees in Tanzania.
- 1987, Freya Stark, Anglo-Italian explorer of the Middle East.
- 1984, Arlene Blum, American biophysical chemist and mountaineer who led the first woman's climbs of Denali (1970), Annapurna (1978), and Bhrigupanth in the Indian Himalayas (1980).
- 1975, Eugenie Clark, American ichthyologist who used scuba diving in her study of shark reproduction and behavior.
- 1975, Mary Douglas Leakey, British paleoanthropologist who studied ancient hominines and hominins at Olduvai Gorge in Tanzania.
- 1975, Marion Stirling Pugh, American archaeologist who discovered and studied Olmec colossal heads in Central America.
- 1950, Irene Wright, American historian of 16th century maritime history, who studied connections between England, Spain, the Caribbean and the Americas.
- 1944, Blair Niles, American novelist and travel writer who wrote about Southeast Asia, Central & South America. One of the founders of the Society.
- 1942, Margaret Mead, American cultural anthropologist who worked among primitive tribes in Samoa, New Guinea, and other South Seas islands.
- 1933, Amelia Earhart, American aviator, the first woman to fly solo across the Atlantic Ocean, May 20, 1932.

== See also ==
- Ernestine Evans
- Edith Ronne
- Frances Carpenter
- Anna Nałkowska
