= Jesús Carranza, Veracruz =

Jesus Carranza
- Municipality
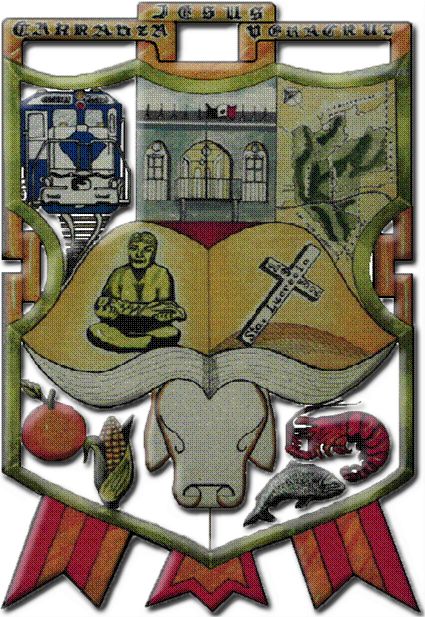
- Coat of arms
- Interactive map of Jesus Carranza
- Coordinates: 17°26′04″N 95°01′36″W
- Country: Mexico
- State: State of Veracruz
- Municipal Status: 1879

Government
  - Municipal President: Leobardo Benítez Osorio (1998-2000)
- Elevation (of seat): 24 m (79 ft)

Population (2000) Municipality
  - Municipality: 25,513
- Time zone: UTC-6 (Central (US Central))
- Postal code (of seat): 96950

Jesus Carranza is a municipality in the Mexican state of Veracruz. The town has an area of 486.32 kilometers squared. It represents about 0.67 percent of the state. Jesus Carranza borders the State of Oaxaca to its west. It is located 435 kilometers from the state capital of Veracruz, Xalapa. Jesus Carranza Municipality governs the communities of Jesus Carranza, Suchilapan River, Col. Nuevo Morelos, El Tepache and Coapiloloyita.

== History ==
Jesus Carranza began as a municipality with the name Suchilapam on December 4, 1879. On October 13, 1910 the town was named Santa Lucrecia by the religious community in the area. On November 5, 1932 the town and municipality was given its current name in honor of the revolutionary general, Jesus Carranza. Jesus Carranza was known for helping Benito Juarez during the Mexican revolution. One of his sons, Venustiano Carranza later became President of Mexico.

Jesus Carranza is one of the areas associated with the ancient Pre-Columbian people, the Olmec. A famous Olmec statue, Senor de las Limas, was discovered in this area in 1965.

On October 28, 2007 a Pemex oil pipeline that passes through Jesus Carranza ruptured. Pemex is Mexico's state owned petroleum company. It was reported that 10,000 barrels of oil leaked into the state's three main waterways. This contamination caused significant environmental impacts in the area.

== Geography ==
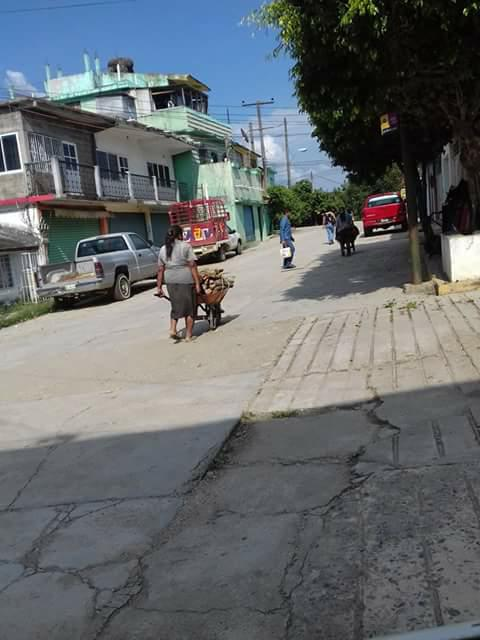
Jesus Carranza Veracruz municipio Mexico (14)

=== Climate ===
Jesus Carranza is located in the foothills of the Sierra Madre Oriental. It has a tropical climate and big rivers, and has an average temperature of 27 degrees Celsius, with rains in November that can last for 30 days straight and a dry season in April, although climate change and land deterioration can cause large floods and an extended dry season that can kill ranch animals and wildlife.

=== Fauna ===
There are many small animals that exist in the area such as wild boar, deer, iguanas, rabbit, reptiles, birds and armadillos. Most lands in the municipality are dedicated to ranching and cows and horses, agriculture, and fishery.

=== Resources ===
Some of the natural resources in the area consist of sand, gravel, mahogany, cedar, zapote, ceiba. There are many marine resources such as snook, turtles and shrimp.

== Agriculture ==
Most of the land in this area, 90 percent, is used for agriculture. The other ten percent is dedicated to occupied housing.

== People ==
The population in Jesus Carranza, according to the 2000 Census, was 25,513 people. The majority of the inhabitants in this area are Spanish speaking. Within the total population exists about 2268 indigenous people. The main language among this group is Chinanteco.

=== Religion ===
There are approximately 17,000 people whose main religion is Catholicism. There are also about 2700 Protestants, 700 that practice other religions and around 2600 people who do not practice any of the recognized religions.
