= Marion Stirling Pugh =

American archaeologist

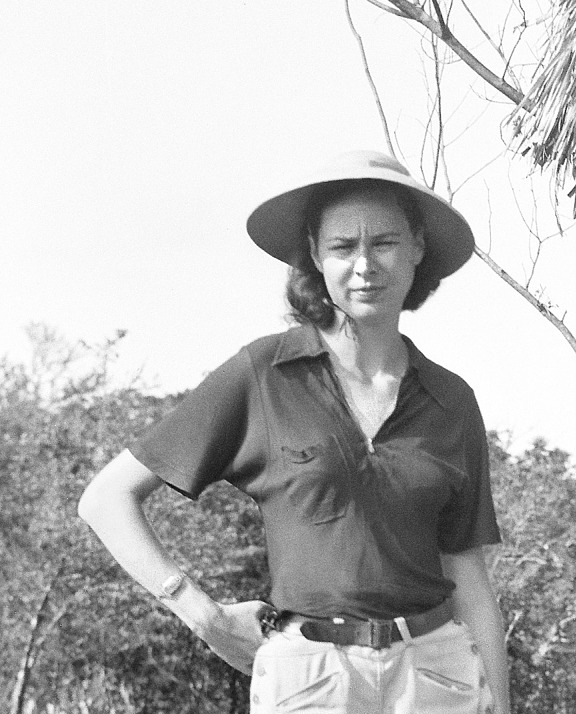
- Veracruz, Mexico, April 15, 1939
- Born: Marion Illig; May 12, 1911; Middletown, New York, US
- Died: April 24, 2001 (aged 89); Tucson, Arizona, US
- Known for: Excavations at Tres Zapotes; Establishment of the antiquity of the Olmec civilization
- Board member of: Society of Women Geographers; Textile Museum (George Washington University)
- Spouses: Matthew Stirling (1933–1975); John Ramsey Pugh (1977–1994)
- Children: 2
- Awards: Franklin L. Burr Award, National Geographic Society (1941); Gold Medal, Society of Women Geographers (1975)

Academic background
- Education: Rider College; George Washington University

Academic work
- Discipline: Archaeology
- Sub-discipline: Mesoamerican archaeology
- Institutions: Bureau of American Ethnology

Marion Stirling Pugh (née Illig, May 12, 1911 – April 24, 2001) was an American archaeologist. She is known for her archaeological expeditions to Tres Zapotes and other sites in Southern Mexico in the 1940s, conducted alongside her husband Matthew Stirling, which according to National Geographic "essentially rewrote Mesoamerican history". Her discovery of a date in the Long Count calendar, corresponding to 32 BCE, on a stela from Tres Zapotes, helped establish the antiquity of the Olmec civilization for the first time. She also served as the president of the Washington Textile Museum, and the Society of Woman Geographers twice (1960–1963 and 1969–1972).

== Early life and education ==
Marion Illig was born in Middletown, New York on May 12, 1911 and graduated from Rider College in 1930. In 1931 she moved to Washington, D.C. to take a position as secretary to Matthew Stirling, the Chief of the Bureau of American Ethnology. Needing to look up the word "ethnology" in a dictionary before she started the job, she studied anthropology under Truman Michelson at George Washington University to better understand the field.

== Archaeological career ==
Illig married Stirling on December 11, 1933. For their honeymoon, she accompanied Stirling as he traveled around the Southeastern United States conducting archaeological excavations for the Public Works Administration. During this time she trained in field archaeology alongside a number of young scholars who would go on to become prominent figures, including Gordon Willey, James A. Ford, Jesse D. Jennings, and Marshall T. Newman.

In 1938, the Stirlings visited Mexico for the first time. While Marion, pregnant with her first child, visited Mitla and Monte Albán, Matthew traveled eight hours on horseback from Tlacotalpan to Tres Zapotes, to see the Olmec colossal head discovered there by José María Melgar y Serrano in 1862. He found that the sculpture was surrounded by a substantial archaeological site and, upon returning to the United States, the Stirlings obtained grants from the National Geographic Society and Smithsonian Institution to explore the area further. Between 1939 and 1946, they conducted eight expeditions to Southern Mexico, which according to National Geographic "essentially rewrote Mesoamerican history". Pugh's role on the excavation was as "housekeeper, bookkeeper, and supervisor of artifact preparation in the field laboratory". Stirling described her as his "co-explorer, co-author and general co-ordinator".

Pugh was a member of the Association of American Geographers and served as the president of the Society of Woman Geographers twice, in 1960–1963 and 1969–1972. She won the National Geographic Society's Franklin L. Burr Award in 1941, along with Matthew Stirling and Richard Hewitt Stewart, and the Society of Women Geographers' Gold Medal in 1975. She had a long association with the Textile Museum at George Washington Museum, serving as a trustee, secretary, treasurer, vice president and president, and establishing a fund for the acquisition of Latin American textiles.

== Personal life and legacy ==
Pugh's first husband Matthew Stirling died in 1975. They had two children, Matthew W. Stirling Jr. (1938–1989) and Ariana Stirling Withers (1942–2015). She was married to John Ramsey Pugh, a retired general involved with the Textile Museum, from 1977 until his death in 1994.

While in her 80s, she travelled to Antarctica.

She died in Tucson, Arizona, on April 24, 2001.

The Stirling archives were donated by their grandchildren to the National Anthropological Archives at the Smithsonian Institution in 2006.

== Selected publications ==
- Stirling, Matthew and Marion I. Stirling. "Tarqui, an early site in Manabi Province, Ecuador." Bureau of American Ethnology, Anthropological Paper 63, Bulletin 196 (1963): 1–28.
- Stirling, Matthew and Marion I. Stirling. "Archaeological notes on Almirante Bay, Bocas del Toro, Panama." Bureau of American Ethnology, Anthropological Paper 72, Bulletin 191 (1964): 255–284.
- Stirling, Matthew and Marion I. Stirling. "The archeology of Taboga, Uraba and Taboguila Islands, Panama." Bureau of American Ethnology, Anthropological Paper 73, Bulletin 191 (1964): 285–348.
- Stirling, Matthew and Marion I. Stirling. "El Limon, an early tomb site in Cocle Province, Panama." Bureau of American Ethnology, Anthropological Paper 71, Bulletin 191 (1964): 247–254.
