= Pam Flowers =

American Arctic explorer, writer and speaker (born 1946)

- Born: 1946 (age 79–80); Sault Ste. Marie, Michigan
- Education: National Outdoor Leadership School
- Occupations: Explorer, writer and speaker
- Known for: First solo woman to traverse a 2,500-mile section of the Northern Passage with her sled-dog team, eastbound.

Pam Flowers (born 1946) is an American explorer, writer and speaker who has led sled-dog expeditions to the Arctic. She finished the Iditarod sled dog race in Alaska in 1983. Ten years later, she travelled solo with her team of eight dogs across 2,500 miles of frozen Arctic terrain in the easterly direction, becoming the first woman and the first American to do so. For her explorations, she was awarded the Gold Medal by the Society of Woman Geographers in 1996.

== Biography ==
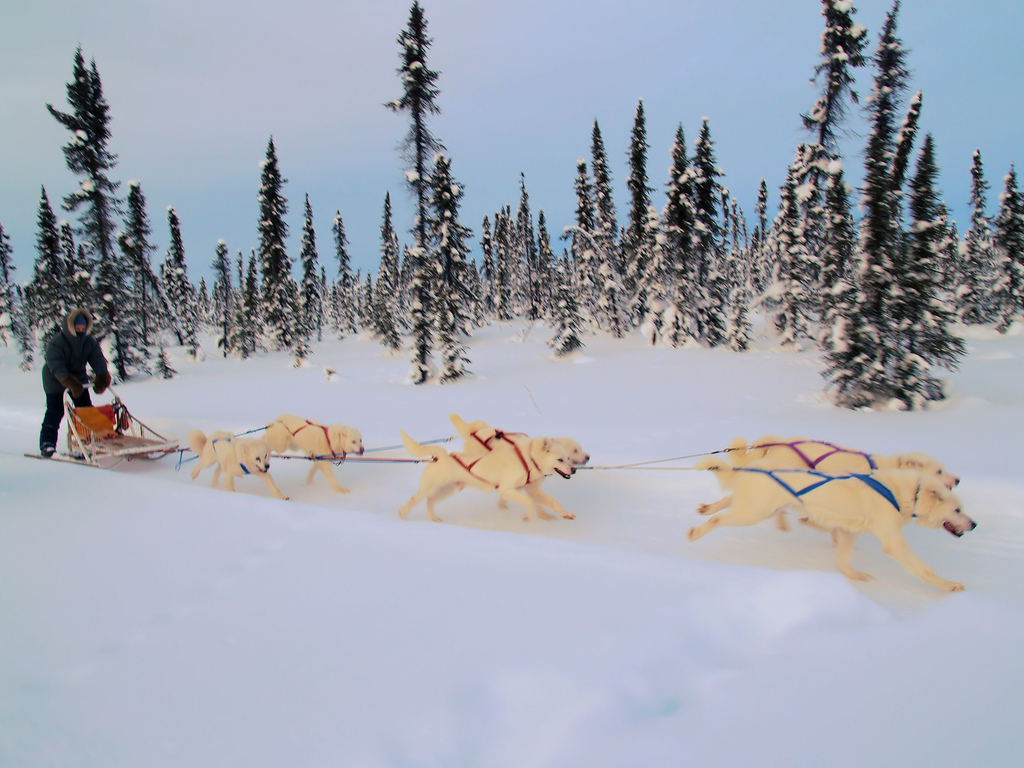
Typical sled dog team. This one features white huskies.

Flowers was born in Sault Ste. Marie, Michigan and graduated from the National Outdoor Leadership School in Lander, Wyoming. She was working as a respiratory therapist in Texas and mushing in her spare time when she decided to move permanently to Alaska in 1981 to become a full-time sled dog musher (driver). Her ultimate goal was to become the first American and the first woman to mush solo from Barrow, Alaska, to Repulse Bay in Northwest Canada.

=== Iditarod race ===
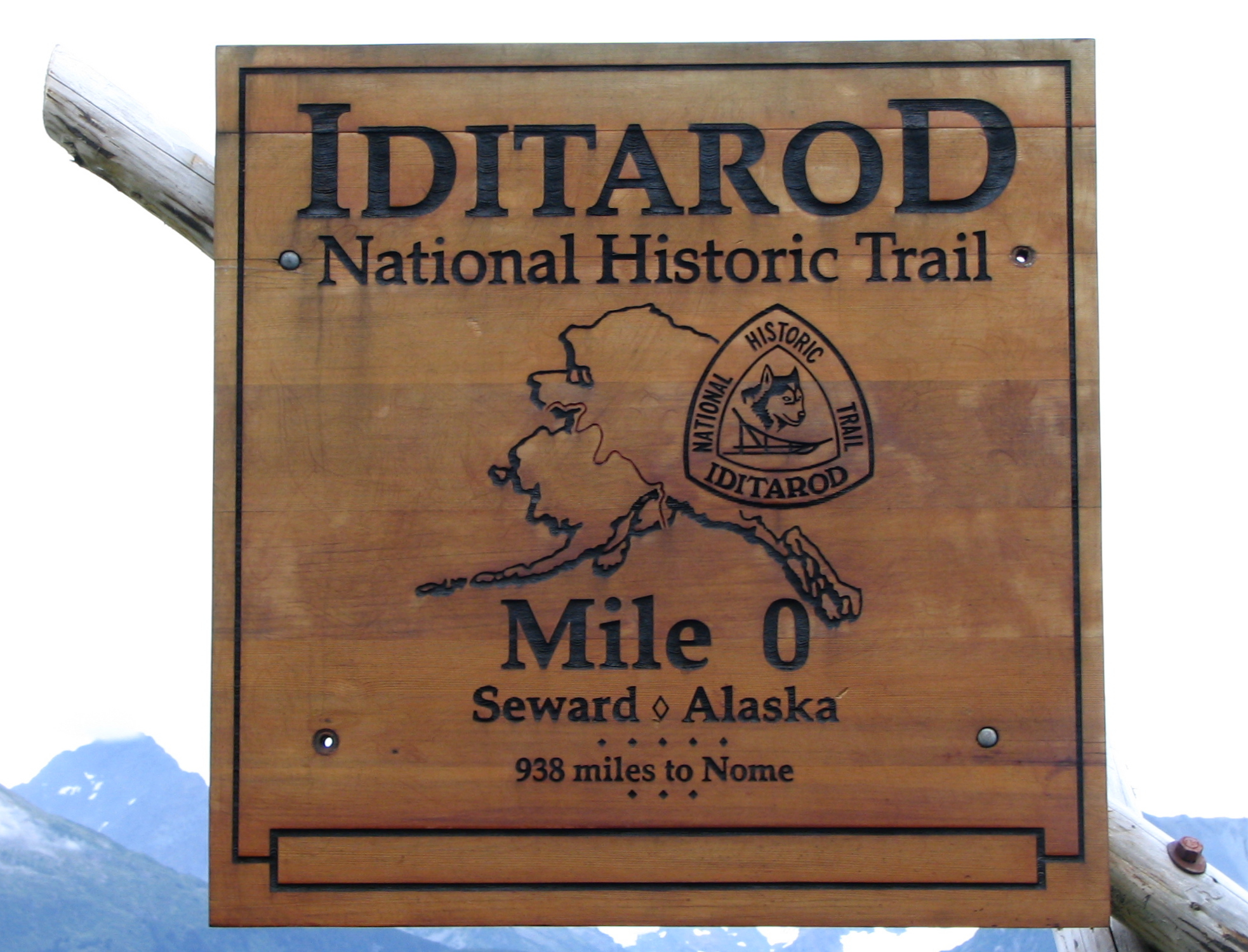
The original starting place for the Iditarod Trail was Seward. It now begins in downtown Anchorage.

In 1983, Flowers competed in the arduous Iditarod sled dog race over the Iditarod Trail, which is held in Alaska every year. The race covers about 1,000 miles from Anchorage to the gold-mining town of Nome, following routes that once provided access to gold rush sites and mail depots. While participating in the race, mushers and their teams of sled dogs move from one checkpoint to the next over many days. Flowers finished her rookie Iditarod race in 20 days, 13 hours, 12 minutes and 54 seconds, coming in 51st place.

=== Arctic expedition ===
In 1993, Flowers and her eight-dog team departed from Barrow, Alaska alone in an intricately planned course to traverse part of the Northwest Passage and "cross the frozen roof of the world." She named her trip the Alaska Odyssey Expedition. Her inspiration came from her desire to retrace the route, from west to east, of the Danish explorer Knud Rasmussen during his Fifth Thule Expedition in the early 1920s. Rasmussen had made the trip in the opposite direction by moving from Repulse Bay in the east to Barrow in the west. The destination that Flowers chose was the remote Canadian village of Repulse Bay (now known as Naujaat), which is 2,500 miles from Barrow. It's located where the Hudson Bay and the Arctic Circle meet.

Pam and her dog team arrived safely in 1994 after a five-month delay in an Inuit village because of premature ice breakup making travel by sled dog impossible. She and her dogs spent that time with a local family until the sea ice was firm enough to continue their trip. By making the journey, Flowers became the first woman and the first American to cross 2,500 miles of the Arctic alone with her dog team in that direction.

=== Appalachian Trail ===
On August 24, 2008, Flowers began hiking south along the 2,174-mile Appalachian Trail from Maine to Georgia, accompanied only by her dog Ellie. During the trek, Flowers injured her back three times from falls and Ellie slipped through ice that covered a stream, nearly drowning. They persevered and completed the trip 199 days later on March 10, 2009.

Returning to her sledding pastime, she led her dogs to the Magnetic North Pole, along the coast of Alaska from Kotzebue to Barrow, including 135 miles out onto the frozen Arctic Ocean. Later, they embarked on many smaller treks."

=== Speaker and writer ===
As a popular inspirational speaker, Flowers routinely travels throughout North America to meet school audiences and tell stories about her adventures. She has spoken to more than 700,000 students in more than 1,000 schools. Her expeditions have been the subjects of her nine books and several articles, many of them written for school students. Her articles have been published in Fur-Fish-Game and Dog World among others.

Flowers has retired from expeditions and lives in Talkeetna, Alaska. There, she raises and trains sled dogs, writes books and conducts school speaking tours for students.

== Distinctions ==
- 14th recipient of the Gold Medal presented by the Society of Woman Geographers (1996)
- Named Outsider of the Year by Outside Magazine (1991).

== Selected works ==
- Flowers, Pam, Hug a Husky, Three-Dog Night Press (Wasilla, Alaska), 1996.
- Flowers, Pam, and Ann Dixon. Alone across the Arctic: one woman's epic journey by dog team. Graphic Arts Books, 2001.
- Flowers, Pam, and Ann Dixon. Big-enough Anna: The Little Sled Dog Who Braved the Arctic, illustrations by Bill Farnsworth, Alaska Northwest Book (Anchorage, Alaska), 2003.
- Flowers, Pam, Douggie, The Playful Pup who became a Sled Dog Hero, 2007.
- Flowers, Pam, Ellie’s Long Walk. The True Story of Two Friends on the Appalachian Trail, 2013.
- Flowers, Pam, Sojo: Memoirs of a Reluctant Sled Dog, 2016.
- Flowers, Pam, Togo and Leonhard, 2020.
