= Irene Aloha Wright =

American historian

Irene A. Wright
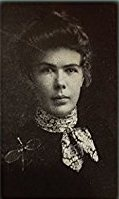
- Born: December 19, 1879; Lake City, Colorado
- Died: April 6, 1972 (aged 92); New Rochelle, New York
- Occupation: Historian

Irene Aloha Wright (December 19, 1879 – April 6, 1972) was an American journalist and historian who wrote several books on colonial history in the Caribbean. Born in Colorado, she lived in Mexico, Cuba, and Spain, and was a distinguished writer and scholar.

== Biography ==
Irene Aloha Wright was born on December 19, 1879, in Lake City, Colorado, to parents Henry Edward Wright and Letitia O. Wright. After her father sold his interest in a gold mine, the family settled in Ouray, Colorado. In 1888, Ed Wright built the Wright Opera House in Ouray. When Wright was fifteen her father died and her mother sent her to school at the Virginia College for Young Ladies in Roanoke, Virginia. Instead of returning to Roanoke for a second year of school, she traveled south to Mexico City where she found work as a governess for the vice-president of Mexico. She also gave English lessons and translated guidebooks for the local museums.

She lived in Mexico for three years before returning home and finishing school at Roanoke in 1898. She then attended Stanford University and graduated in 1904 with a Bachelor of Arts in history. After graduation she took her mother with her to Cuba, where she worked as she was a writer for the Havana Post from 1904 to 1905. When Wright left the Post she became a city editor for the Havana Telegraph, a position she held for three years. The next year, she purchased The Cuba Magazine, a weekly politics and culture magazine for American readers which she owned until 1914. In 1910, Wright published her first book, Cuba, a contemporary account of the island.

In 1914, she moved to Seville, gave up journalism, and focused instead on archival research at the Archives of the Indies. She spent the next two decades in Spain where she translated and edited over 100,000 colonial documents. In 1916, she published The Early History of Cuba, 1492–1586, the first modern history of the early Caribbean that relied almost entirely on primary sources.

During her stay in Spain she published several additional books, including Historia documentada de San Cristo, bal de la Habana en el siglo XVI (Documented History of Havana in the Sixteenth Century)(1927) and Documents concerning English voyages to the Spanish main, 1569–1580 (1932). She also compiled a variety of reports on the early Dutch slave trade for the Dutch government. Spain and Britain also commissioned her to research and translate documents relating to their country's colonial history. The John B. Stetson family hired her to create an archive of Spanish documents covering the settlement of Florida by Spanish conquistadors. This archive remains "the most important and frequently cited collection of papers regarding the Spanish occupation of Florida to this day outside of the archive in Seville." In 1949, she published one of her last books, English Voyages to the Caribbean, 1580–1592.

From 1932 to 1936, Wright also served as a representative of the Library of Congress in Spain. In 1936, the outbreak of the Spanish Civil War forced her to leave Spain with her mother and adopted daughter. She went to work for the United States National Archives as an associate archivist, a job she held for two years. Wright subsequently became a Foreign affairs specialist for the Department of State, and served as chief of its cultural relations division for Latin America and as an attestation officer. She served in that capacity until 1952. She died on April 6, 1972, at the age of 92.

Wright received awards from the governments of Spain and Cuba. She was awarded gold medals from both the Havana Academy of History and the Society of Woman Geographers. In 1953, Wright became president of the Society of Woman Geographers. In addition, she was a member of the Royal Historical Society of England and the Royal Historical Society of the Netherlands.

== Publications ==
- Historia documentada de San Cristóbal de la Habana en el siglo XVI, basada en los documentos originales existentes en el Archivo general de Indias en Sevilla [Documented History of Havana in the Sixteenth Century] (in Spanish). Habana: Impr. El Siglo XX. 1927. OCLC 1866796.
- Cuba. New York: Macmillan, 1910. OCLC 1703123
- Early History of Cuba, 1492-1586. 1916. OCLC 958710900.
- Spanish documents concerning English voyages to the Caribbean, 1527-1568. London: Hakluyt Society. 1929. OCLC 906156245.
- The gem of the Caribbean. Isle of Pines: The Isle of Pines publicity Company. 1909. OCLC 1875728.
- Spanish narratives of the British attack on Santo Domingo, 1655. London: Offices of the Society. 1926. OCLC 977556313.
