= Las Limas Monument 1 =

Olmec greenstone sculpture

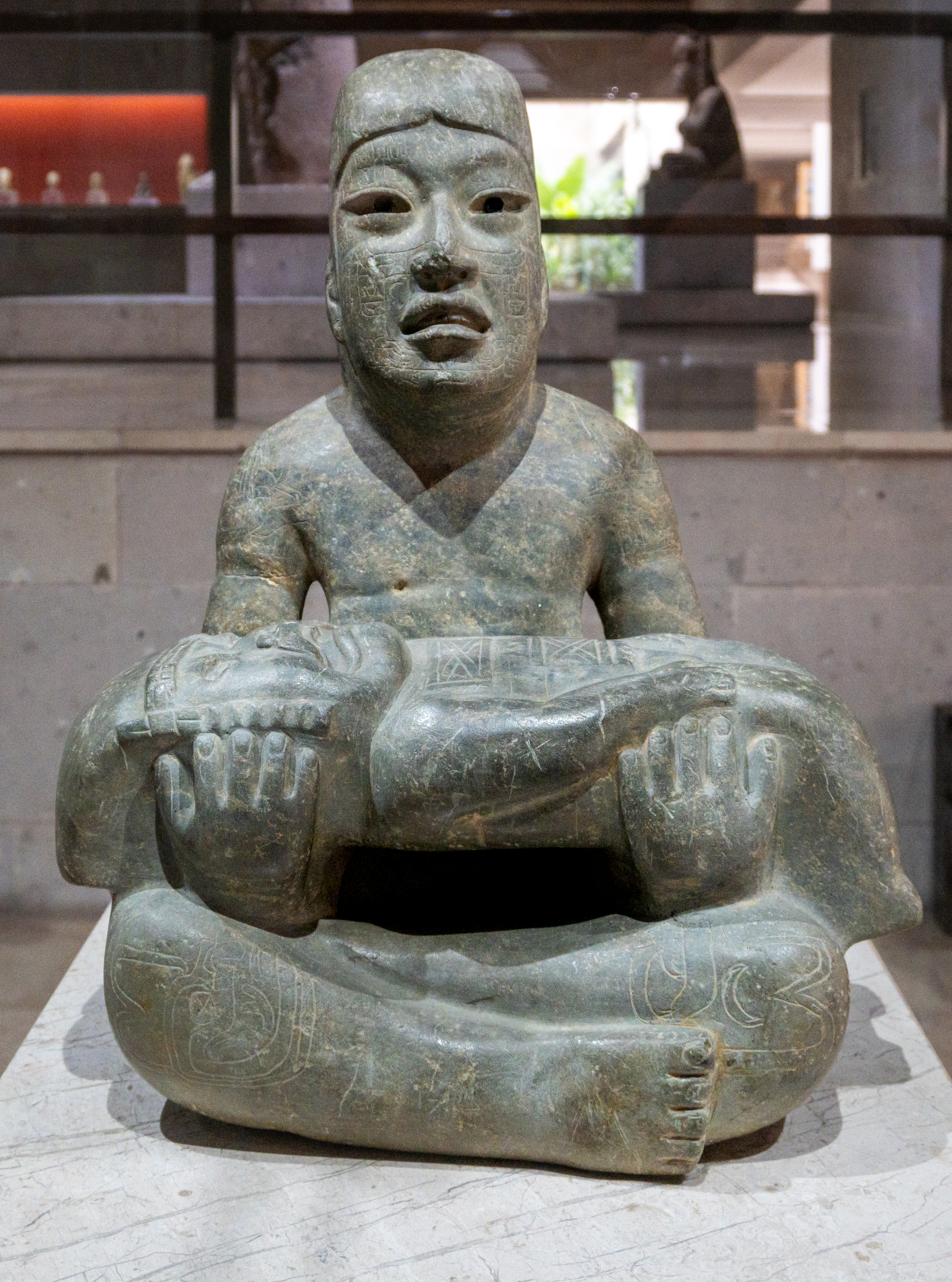
- At highest resolution, the shallow incisions on the shoulders, legs, and face can be clearly seen
- Material: Greenstone
- Height: 55 cm (22 in)
- Created: Middle Formative Period (1000 BCE – 600 BCE)
- Discovered: 1965 near Jesús Carranza, Veracruz, Mexico
- Present location: Xalapa Museum of Anthropology, Veracruz
- Culture: Olmec

Las Limas Monument 1, also known as the Las Limas figure or the Señor de las Limas, is a 55-centimetre (22 in) greenstone figure of a youth holding a limp were-jaguar baby. Found in the State of Veracruz, Mexico, in the Olmec heartland, the statue is famous for its incised representations of Olmec supernaturals. It is the largest known greenstone sculpture.

== Interpretation ==
Sculptures of headdressed figures holding inert were-jaguar babies appear often in the Olmec archaeological record, from the smallest of figurines to the huge table-top thrones such as La Venta Altar 5.

What these sculptures symbolised to the Olmecs is not clear. Some researchers, focusing on the symbolic cave surrounding the figure on Altar 5 believe that these sculptures relate to myths of spiritual journeys or human origins. Others find that the limp depiction of the were-jaguar baby denotes child sacrifice.

Figure from right shoulder, generally identified as the Banded-eye God. The narrow band running through the nose and down the face of this supernatural is nearly identical to the incised bands running down the youth's face.

Figure from right leg, generally identified as the Olmec Dragon. The X-like symbol here covering the eye is also seen on the were-jaguar baby's chest. It is a common Olmec motif.

Figure from left shoulder, generally identified as the Bird Monster. The "flame eyebrows" seen on this image are a common Olmec motif.

Figure from left leg, generally identified as the Fish or Shark Monster

== History ==
Las Limas, in relation to the other Olmec heartland sites. The yellow dots represent ancient habitation sites, while the red dots represent artifact finds.

The statue is 55 cm (22 in) high, 42 cm (17 in) wide, and weighs an estimated 60 kg (130 lb). It was probably carved during the Middle Formative Period, some time between 1000 and 600 BCE).

The statue was discovered 16 July 1965 near Jesús Carranza, Veracruz, by two local children, Rosa and Severiano Paschal Manuel. Dug out and taken to their nearby home, it was declared "La Virgen de las Limas" and set up on its own altar. Word of the find reached archaeologists in Xalapa. After promising to keep the statue on display and to build a local school, the archaeologists moved the sculpture to the Xalapa Museum of Anthropology, in Veracruz.

Five years later, in October 1970, the statue was stolen from the museum, only later to be found in a motel room in San Antonio, Texas; it had been apparently too famous to be sold on the black market. It was subsequently restored to display at the Xalapa Museum of Anthropology.

== Sources ==
- Coe, Michael D. (1968) Discovering the Olmec, American Heritage.
- "The Antiquities Market", in Journal of Field Archaeology, Vol. 1, No. 1/2 (1974), pp. 215–224.
- López Navarro, Raúl, "El Señor de las Limas", Actualidades Arqueológicas, Número 10 Enero-Febrero 1997. (in Spanish)
- Joralemon, Peter David (1996) "In Search of the Olmec Cosmos: Reconstructing the World View of Mexico's First Civilization". In E. P. Benson and B. de la Fuente (eds.), Olmec Art of Ancient Mexico. Washington, D.C.: National Gallery of Art: 51-60. ISBN 0-89468-250-4.
- Miller, Mary Ellen (2001). The Art of Mesoamerica (3rd ed.). London: Thames & Hudson. ISBN 0-500-20345-8.
- Pool, Christopher (2007) Olmec Archaeology and Early Mesoamerica, Cambridge University Press, UK.
- Reilly, F. Kent (1995) "Olmec-style Iconography", Foundation for the Advancement of Mesoamerican Studies, Inc., accessed March 2007.
