= Greenstone (archaeology) =

Various green-hued minerals used in early cultures for carving various artifacts

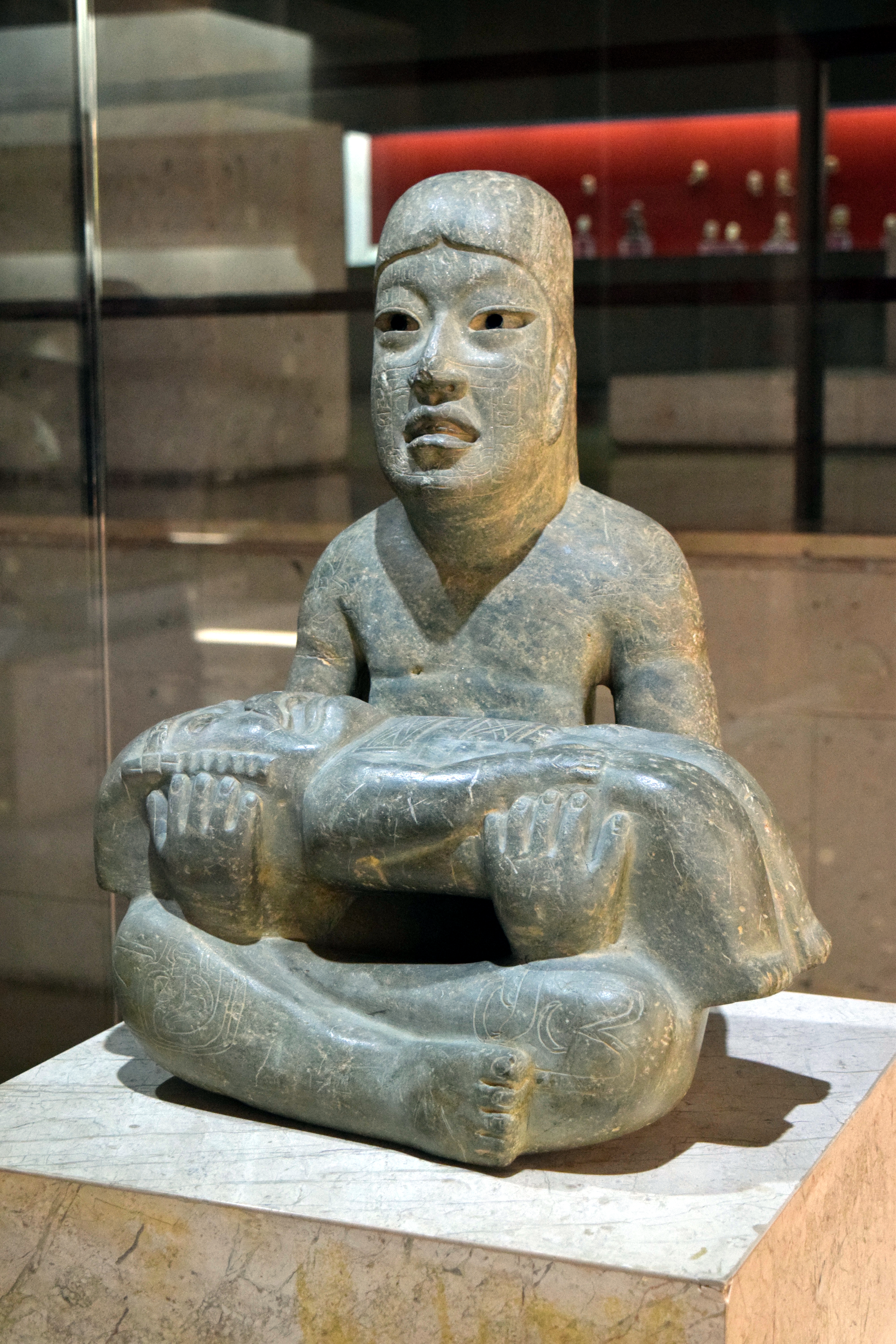
El Señor de las Limas, the largest known greenstone sculpture, Xalapa Museum

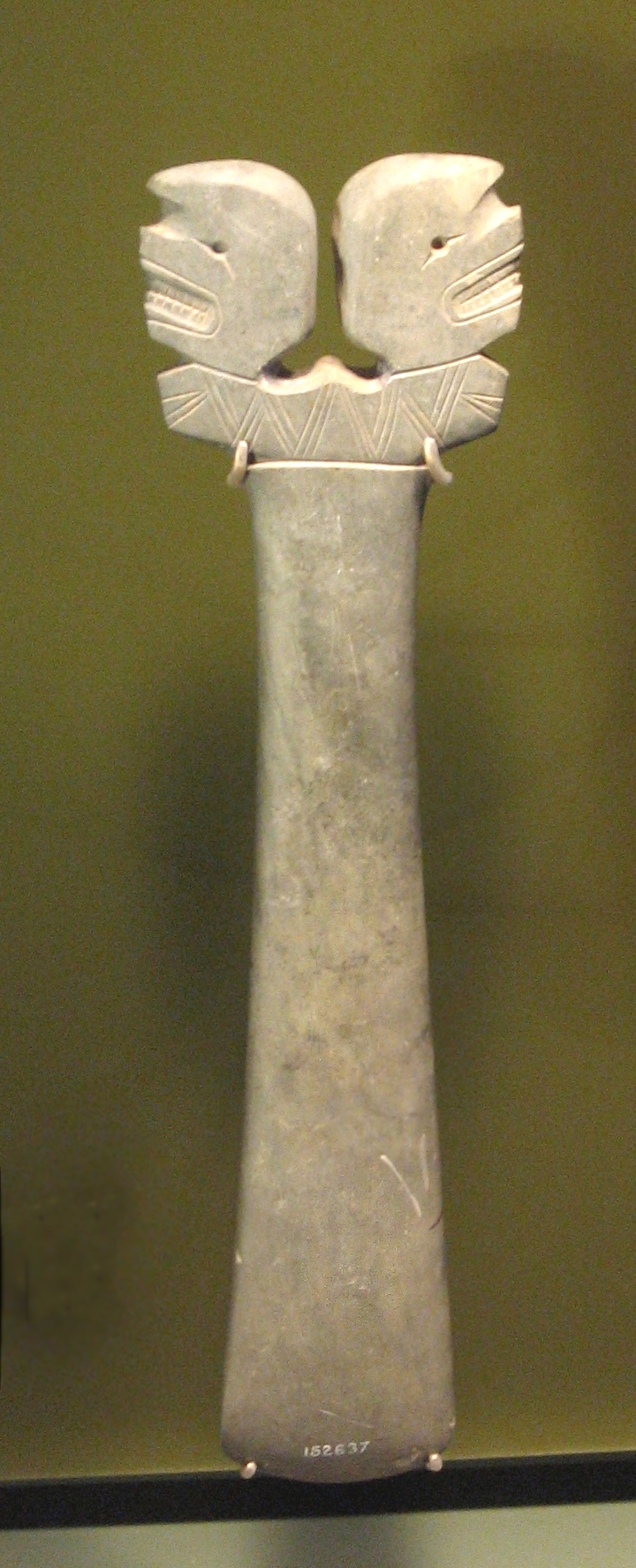
Greenstone staff, 1550–1600 AD, from the Tairona culture of present-day Colombia

Greenstone is a common generic term for valuable, green-hued minerals and metamorphosed igneous rocks and stones which early cultures used in the fashioning of hardstone carvings such as jewelry, statuettes, ritual tools, and various other artifacts. Greenstone artifacts may be made of greenschist, chlorastrolite, serpentine, omphacite, chrysoprase, olivine, nephrite, chloromelanite among other green-hued minerals. The term also includes jade and jadeite, although these are perhaps more frequently identified by these latter terms. The greenish hue of these rocks generally derives from the presence of minerals such as chlorite, hornblende, or epidote.

Greenstone minerals were presumably selected for their color rather than their chemical composition. In archaeology therefore, having a loosely applied general term is at least partially influenced by the observation that ancient cultures often used and considered these various green-hued materials as interchangeable. Greenstone objects are often found very considerable distances from the source of the rock, indicating early travel or trading networks. A polished jadeite axe head in the British Museum (4000–2000 BCE) was found in Canterbury, Kent but uses stone from the Alps of Northern Italy, and objects from other parts of the world had travelled comparable distances to their findspots.

Ancient China and Mesoamerica have special reputations for the prevalence and significance of greenstone (particularly jade and serpentinite) usage. Greenstones also figure prominently in the indigenous cultures of southeastern Australia, and among the Māori of New Zealand (who knew greenstone as pounamu). Neolithic Europe also used greenstone, especially for prestige versions of axe tools, not made for use; comparable jade versions of tools and weapons also appeared in the Olmec and other Pre-Columbian cultures and in early Chinese civilization.

== Gallery of greenstone versions of tools or weapons ==
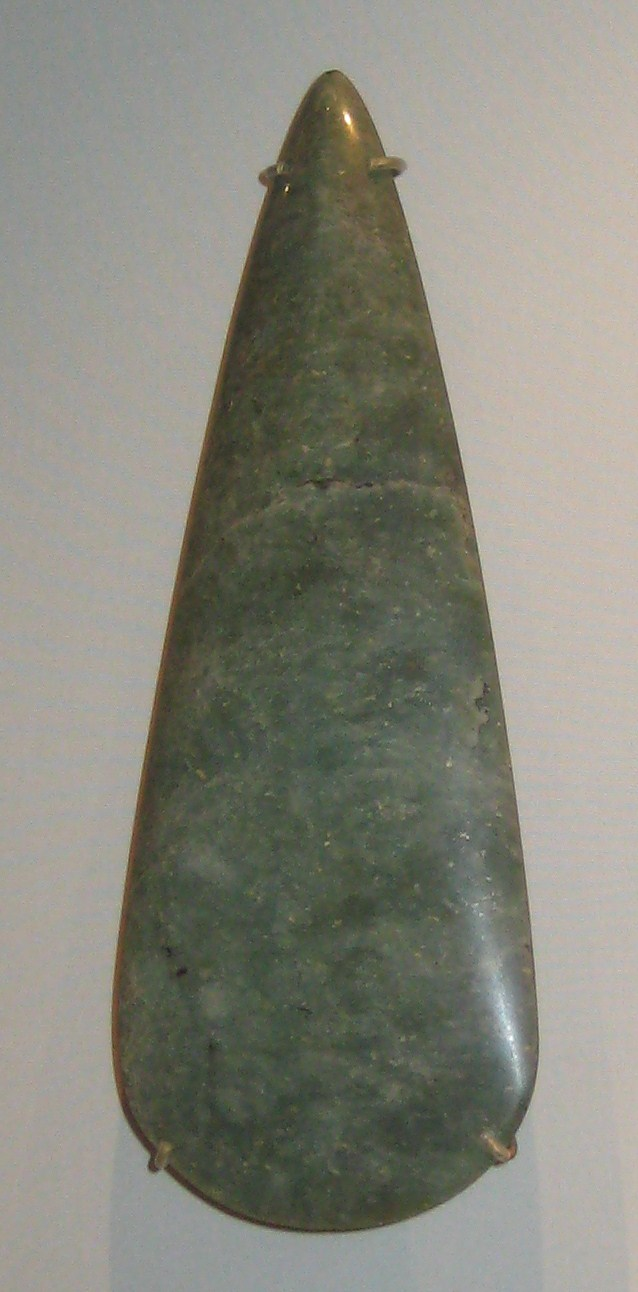
Neolithic jadeite axe head, found in England but made from stone from the Italian Alps

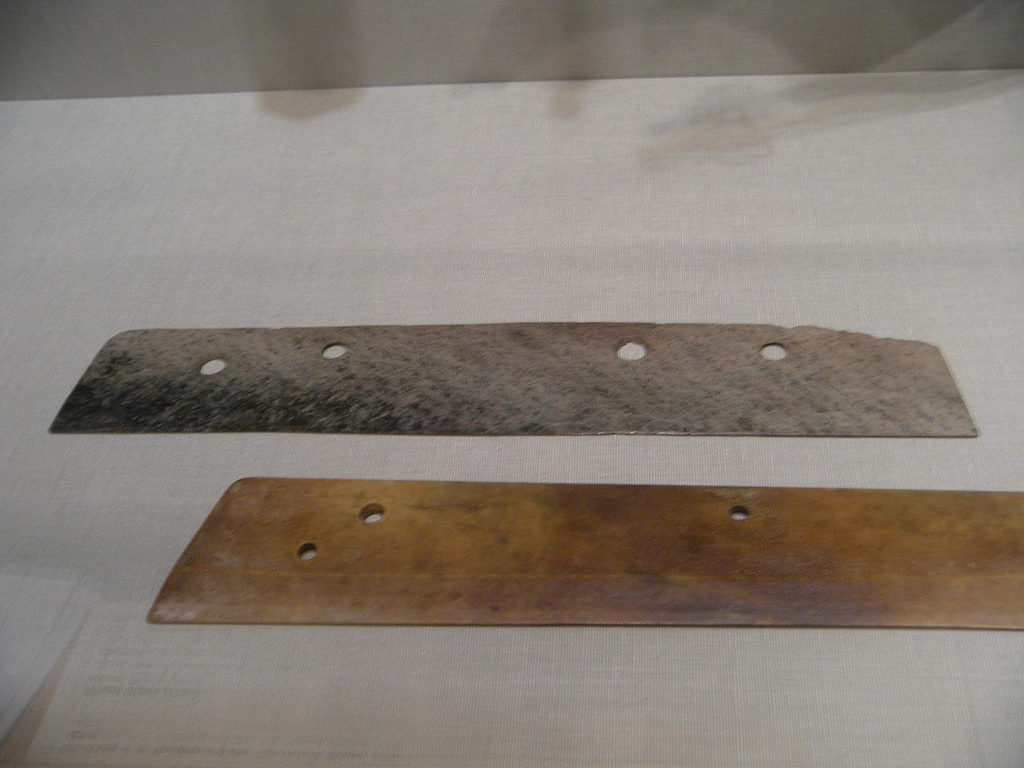
Nephrite ritual blade from Neolithic China

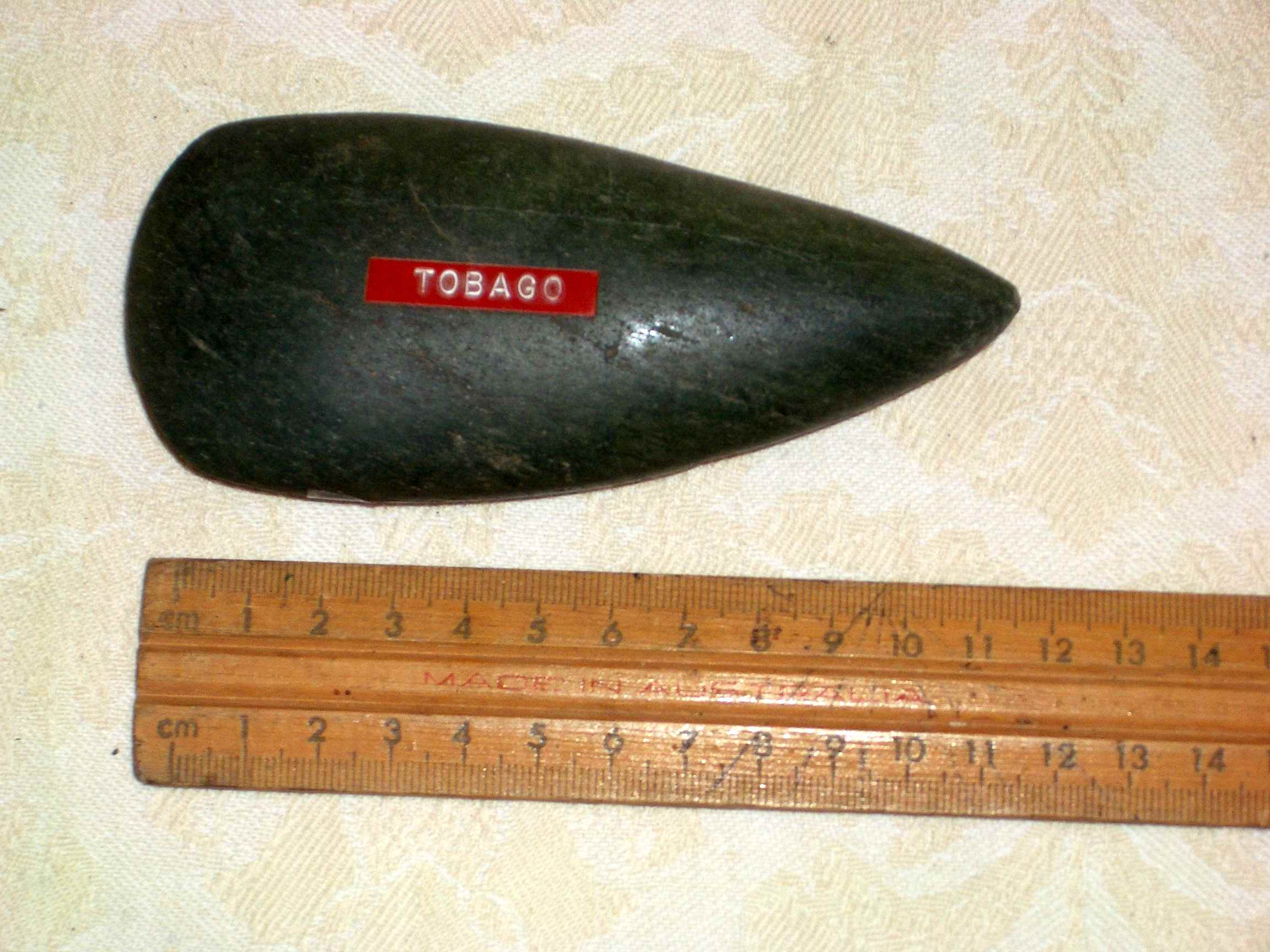
Greenstone ceremonial axe from Tobago

== See also ==
- Jade use in Mesoamerica
