= Werecat =

Feline therianthropic creature

Creature information
- Other name: Vârcopisică
- Grouping: Therianthrope
- Similar entities: Werewolf; Skin-walker
- Folklore: Legendary creature Mythological hybrid

A werecat (also written in a hyphenated form as were-cat) is an analog to "werewolf" for a feline therianthropic creature.

== Etymology ==
Ailuranthropy comes from the Greek root words ailouros meaning "cat", and anthropos, meaning "human" and refers to human/feline transformations, or to other beings that combine feline and human characteristics. Its root word ailouros is also used in ailurophilia, the most common term for a deep love of cats.

Ailuranthrope is a lesser-known term that refers to a feline therianthrope.

Depending on the story in question, the species involved can be a domestic cat, a tiger, a lion, a leopard, a lynx, or any other type, including some that are purely mythical felines. Werecats are increasingly featured in popular culture, although not as often as werewolves.

== Folklore ==
=== Europe ===
European folklore usually depicts werecats as people who transform into domestic cats. Some European werecats became giant domestic cats or panthers. They are generally labelled witches, even though they may have no magical ability other than self-transformation. During the witch trials, all shapeshifters, including werewolves, were considered witches whether they were male or female.

=== Africa ===
African legends describe werelions, werepanthers or wereleopards. In the case of leopards, this is often because the creature is really a leopard deity masquerading as a human. When these gods mate with humans, offspring can be produced, and these children sometimes grow up to be shapeshifters; those who do not transform may instead have other powers. In reference to werecats who turn into lions, the ability is often associated with royalty. Such a being may have been a king or queen in a former life.

In Tanzania, there are folk tales that speak of the "Nunda," or the "Mngwa," a big cat of immense size that stalks villages at night. Many of these tales say it is more ferocious than a lion and more agile than a leopard. The Nunda are believed by some to be a variation of therianthrope that, by day, is a human, but by night becomes the werecat. No actual evidence of such a creature existing has ever been documented, but in 1938, a British administrator named William Hitchens, working in Tanganyika Territory, was told by locals that a monstrous cat had been attacking people at night. Huge paw prints were found to be much larger than any known big-cat, but Hitchens dismissed the case, believing it more likely to be a lion with gigantism.

=== Asia ===
Mainland Asian werecats usually become tigers. In India, the weretiger is often a dangerous sorcerer, portrayed as a menace to livestock, who might at any time turn to man-eating. These tales travelled through the rest of India and into Persia through travellers who encountered the royal Bengal tigers of India and then further west. Chinese legends often describe weretigers as the victims of either a hereditary curse or a vindictive ghost. Alternatively, the ghosts of people who had been killed by tigers could become a malevolent supernatural being known as "Chang" (伥), devoting all their energy to making sure that tigers killed more humans. Some of these ghosts were responsible for transforming ordinary humans into man-eating weretigers. Also, in Japanese folklore there are creatures called bakeneko that are similar to kitsune (fox spirits) and bake-danuki (Japanese raccoon dog spirits).

In Thailand a tiger that eats many humans may become a weretiger. There are also other types of weretigers, such as sorcerers with great powers who can change their form to become animals. A weretiger in Thailand known as Suea Saming (Thai: เสือสมิง, pronounced [sɯ̌a̯ sā.mǐŋ], lit. 'Saming tiger') or Saming for short. There are numerous legends related to the viciousness of Suea Samings, and many people of the older generations still believe these tales to be true, though members the younger generations may not have heard them. Samings are men or women who can transform themselves into tigers or tigresses. One famous story about these transforming tigers from the literature of King Chulalongkorn (Rama V) that some used to prowl through Chanthaburi province; the locals continue to be very afraid of Samings. They said that in Cambodia there were sorcerers who knew how to make Saming oil, and their students once stole that oil and applied it to their bodies. By doing so, there of them were able to transform themselves into Samings. One student got lost inside the town of Chanthaburi. He was a vicious tiger. He roamed around and attacked and killed two people in Pliew village, one person in Pakjun village, and two people in the Seesen forestland. In total, five people were killed by this Saming. Their teacher followed them and told the villagers that his three students had applied the Saming oil to their bodies and were transformed into tigers. The parents of the young men wanted to get their sons back, so they came with the teacher and searched for them everywhere. The parents told villagers that if they met one of these tigers, they should hit him with a shoulder pole or cover his footprints with coconut shells. This would make that tiger transform back into a human, but only if the tiger had not eaten anyone yet; if it had eaten a man, this method would not bring it back to human form. The details of the Saming in each region are different, but they share a common feature; a Saming is a tiger or tigress that is capable of transforming itself into a person for the purpose of deceiving people and then catching them and eating them. It is also believed that a person who has become a Saming is unable to light a match. Although its hands appear human, they are said to have the characteristics of tiger paws. When encountering someone believed to be a Saming, this method is therefore used as a way to determine whether the person is truly a Saming.

According to the beliefs of the S'gaw people living along the Salween river near the Thai–Myanmar border, the Saming is believed to be a tutelary deity who watches over and protects the forest. As a result, there is a traditional belief and practice that hunting or constructing hunting platforms at mineral licks, which are gathering places for wild animals, is prohibited. Some people who claim to have encountered the guardian of a mineral lick at night have described it as having three eyes, with the third eye located in the middle of its forehead and glowing green in the darkness. According to S'gaw folklore, those who encounter a Saming may be approached by an apparition taking the form of a woman or one's wife, who comes into the forest and tells the person that their child is ill and that they must return home. Those who descend from their hunting platform are then said to be killed. In some accounts, when a person refuses to come down, the apparition later returns with four other people carrying a stretcher bearing the body of the supposed child or wife. Some people have reportedly fired their guns at the apparition. The following morning, after descending from the hunting platform, they are said to have found large tiger footprints scattered throughout the area. It is therefore believed that the four people seen carrying the stretcher were actually the tiger's four legs.

In both present-day Indonesia and Malaysia, there is another kind of weretiger, known as Harimau jadian. Linguist and writer Zainal Abidin bin Ahmad for example has compiled oral stories of a famous weretiger named Dato' Paroi fabled to have led the flock of all tigers that roamed in his home area of Negeri Sembilan. In Malaysia too, Bajangs have been described as vampiric or demonic werecats. The Kerinchi Malays of Sumatra were reputed to have the ability to transform into weretigers.

In the central area of the Indonesian island of Java, the power of transformation is regarded as due to inheritance, to the use of spells, to fasting and willpower, to the use of charms, etc. Save when it is hungry or has just cause for revenge it is not hostile to man; in fact, it is said to take its animal form only at night and to guard the plantations from wild pigs. Variants of this belief assert that the shapeshifter does not recognize his friends unless they call him by name, or that he goes out as a mendicant and transforms himself to take vengeance on those who refuse him alms. Somewhat similar is the belief of the Khonds; for them the tiger is friendly, and he reserves his wrath for their enemies. A man is said to take the form of a tiger in order to wreak a just vengeance.

=== The Americas ===
The foremost were-animal in pre-Columbian Mesoamerican cultures was the were-jaguar. It was associated with the veneration of the jaguar, with priests and shamans among the various peoples who followed this tradition, wearing the skins of jaguars to "become" a were-jaguar. Among the Aztecs, an entire class of specialized warriors who dressed in the jaguar skins were called "jaguar warriors" or "jaguar knights". Depictions of the jaguar and the were-jaguar are among the most common motifs among the artifacts of the ancient Mesoamerican civilizations.

N. W. Thomas wrote in the 11th ed. of the Encyclopaedia Britannica (1911) that, according to Carl Friedrich Philipp von Martius (1794–1868), the kanaima was a human being who employed poison to carry out his function of blood avenger, and that other authorities represent the kanaima as a jaguar, which was either an avenger of blood or the familiar of a cannibalistic sorcerer. He also mentioned that in 1911 some Europeans in Brazil believed that the seventh child of the same sex in unbroken succession becomes a were-man or woman, and takes the form of a horse, goat, jaguar or pig.

In the US, urban legends tell of encounters with feline bipeds; beings similar to the Bigfoot having cat heads, tails, and paws. Feline bipeds are sometimes classified as part of cryptozoology; more often, however, they are interpreted as werecats.

== Occultism and theology ==
Assertions that werecats truly exist and have an origin in supernatural or religious realities have been common for centuries, with these beliefs often being hard to entirely separate from folklore. In the 19th century, occultist J. C. Street asserted that material cat and dog transformations could be produced by manipulating the "ethereal fluid" that human bodies are supposedly floating in. The Catholic witch-hunting manual, the Malleus Maleficarum, asserted that witches can turn into cats, but that their transformations are illusions created by demons. New Age author John Perkins asserted that every person has the ability to shapeshift into "jaguars, bushes, or any other form" by using mental power. Occultist Rosalyn Greene claims that werecats called "cat shifters" exist as part of a "shifter subculture" or underground New Age religion based on lycanthropy and related beliefs.

== See also ==
- Anthropomorphism
- Barongan
- Catgirl
- Leopard Society
- Lycanthropy (disambiguation)
- Shapeshifting
- Skin-walker
- Therianthropy
- Were
- Werehyena
- Werejaguar
