= Werehyena =

Mythological creature

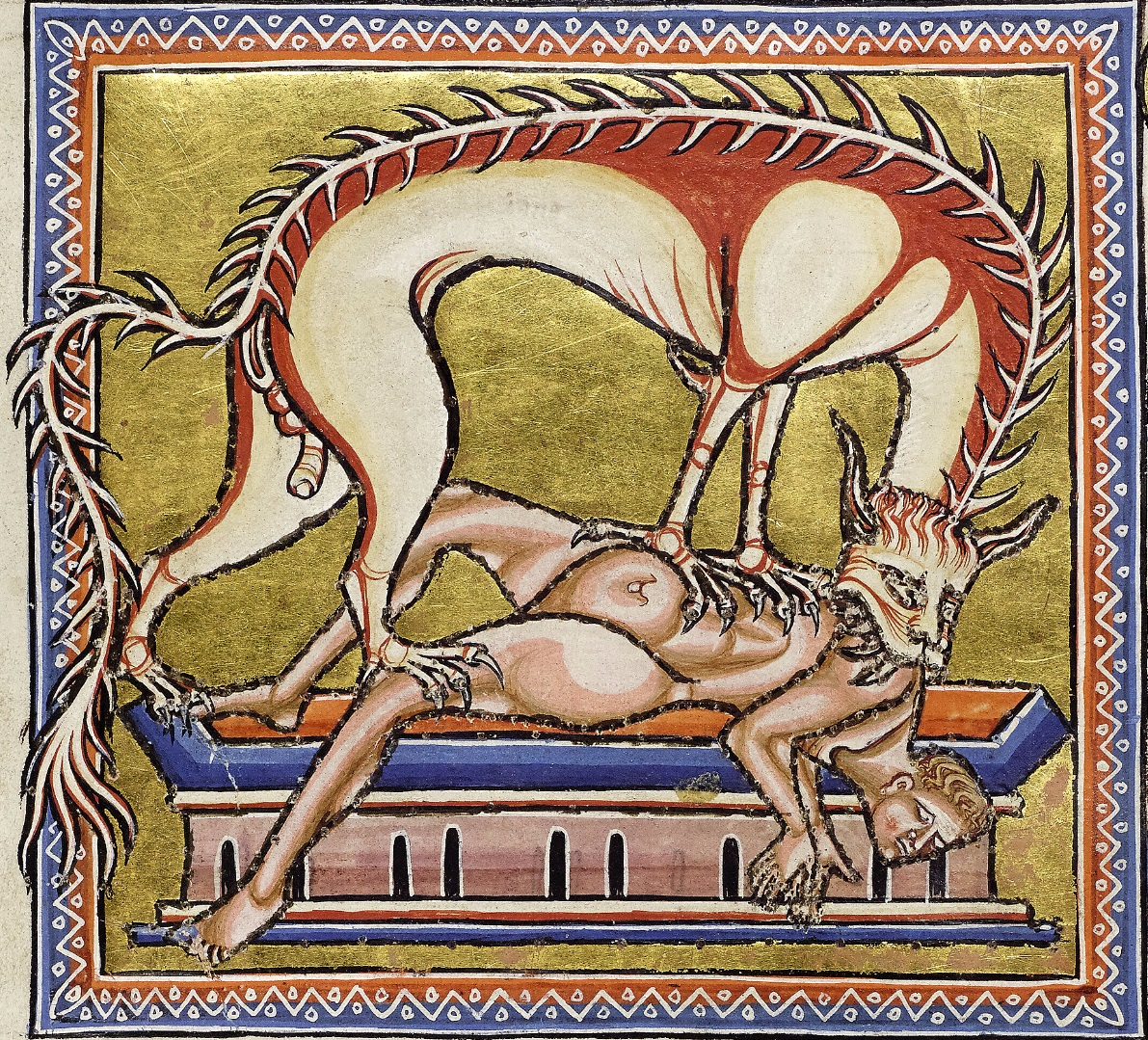
A hyena as depicted in a medieval bestiary

In folklore, a werehyena (a neologism coined in analogy to werewolf), also known as a hyenanthrope, is a creature which can shapeshift into a hyena. The creature has origins across countless African cultures. It is also present in tales on the Arabian Peninsula. Unlike werewolves and other shapeshifters, which are usually portrayed as being originally human, some werehyena lore tells of how they can also be hyenas disguised as humans.

== African cultures ==
In Angola and the Democratic Republic of the Congo, the Kimbundu and Bakongo peoples believe that werehyenas can exist as spirits of the dead or deceptive evil spirits. Those that exist as evil spirits are called kishi, or spirits with two faces. One account of a kishi is that of a werehyena-like being that first appears as an attractive man, which allows him to lure away unsuspecting women with his charm. Once alone, he turns around to reveal a hyena face on the back of his head and devours the woman.

Members of the Korè cult of the Bambara people in Mali "become" hyenas by imitating the animals' behavior through masks and roleplay. These are evocative of the hyenas' reviled habits and may also be used to evoke fear among the participants, leading them to avoid such habits and traits in their own lives.

In Ethiopia, it is traditionally believed that every blacksmith, whose trade is hereditary, is really a wizard or witch with the power to change into a hyena. These blacksmith werehyenas are believed to rob graves at midnight and are referred to as bouda (also spelled buda). They are viewed with suspicion by most countrymen. Belief in the bouda is also present in Sudan and Tanzania, as well as Morocco, where some Berbers regard them as a man or woman who nightly turns into a hyena and resumes human shape at dawn. Many Ethiopian Christians characterize Ethiopian Jews as being bouda, accusing them of unearthing Christian corpses and consuming them; the commonality of blacksmithing as a traditional profession for Jewish men in Ethiopia may be a reason for the connection between the two beliefs.

In the Kanuri language of the former Bornu Empire in the Lake Chad region, werehyenas are referred to as bultungin which translates into "I change myself into a hyena". It was once traditionally believed that one or two of the villages in the region was populated entirely by werehyenas, such as Kabultiloa. Any such person is called ngadza.

In Somalia, it is traditionally believed that Qori Ismaris ("One who rubs himself with a stick") was a man who could transform himself into a "hyena-man" by rubbing himself with a magic stick at nightfall and by repeating this process could return to his human state before dawn.

In the folklore of western Sudanic peoples, there is a hybrid creature, a human who is nightly transformed into a cannibalistic monster that terrorizes people, especially lovers. The creature is often portrayed as a magically powerful healer, blacksmith, or woodcutter in its human form, but recognizable through signs like a hairy body, red and gleaming eyes, and a nasal voice.

== Other cultures ==
Al-Damiri, in his 1371 Ḥayāt al-ḥayawān al-kubrā, wrote that hyenas are vampiric creatures that attack people at night and suck the blood from their necks. Arab folklore tells of how hyenas can mesmerise victims with their eyes or sometimes with their pheromones.

A New Persian medical treatise written in 1376 tells how to cure people known as kaftar, who are said to be "half-man, half-hyena", who have the habit of slaughtering children.

The Greeks, until the end of the 19th century, believed that the bodies of werewolves, if not destroyed, would haunt battlefields as vampiric hyenas which drank the blood of dying soldiers.

== Popular culture ==
Werehyenas have appeared in popular culture:

- In DC Comics, Firestorm villain Hyena is an example of a werehyena; there have been different versions of this character.
- The Monsters episode "One Wolf's Family" features a werehyena named Stanley (portrayed by Robert Clohessy) who wants to marry the werewolf Anya Lupazian (portrayed by Amy Stiller) much to the dismay of her father Victor (portrayed by Jerry Stiller) and to the joy of her mother Greta (portrayed by Anne Meara).
- The 1994 film The Heart's Cry features a werehyena.
- The Buffy the Vampire Slayer episode "The Pack" featured creatures similar to the werehyena.
- Ilona Andrews's Kate Daniels urban fantasy series features clan of werehyenas.
- The 2010 video game Cabela's Dangerous Hunts 2011 has a large hyena beast named the "Kaftar" as the final boss; the game heavily implies that the Kaftar is a werehyena.
- The 2011 film Hyenas featured some werehyenas.
- The 2021 fantasy novel Skin of the Sea by Natasha Bowen features werehyenas.

== See also ==
- Blood libel
- Crocotta
- Ghoul
- Leopard Society
- Shapeshifting
- Skin-walker
- Were
- Werecat
- Werejaguar
