= Lycanthropy (disambiguation) =

Lycanthropy is the mythological ability or power of a human being to undergo transformation into an animal like state, such as a werewolf.

Lycanthropy may also refer to:

- Clinical lycanthropy, the delusional belief that a person can transform into a wolf or other animal
- Lycanthropy (album), a 2003 album by Patrick Wolf
- "Lycanthropy," a song by Six Feet Under from Haunted
- "Lycanthropy", a song by Fear Before from The Always Open Mouth

== See also ==
- Lycanthrope (disambiguation)
