= Marshall Howard Saville =

American archaeologist

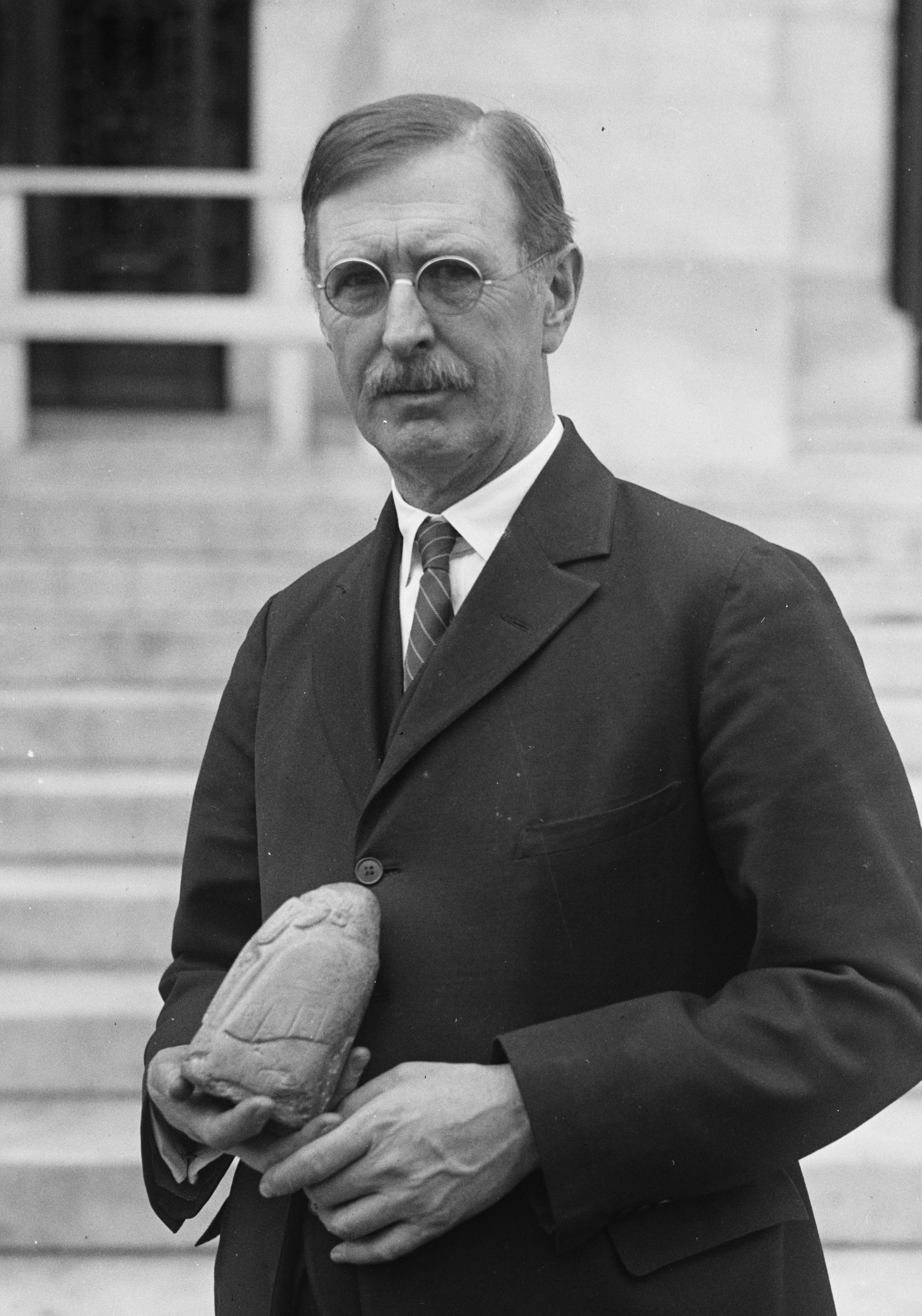
- Saville in 1923
- Born: June 24, 1867; Rockport, Massachusetts
- Died: May 7, 1935 (aged 67)

Academic background
- Education: Harvard University

Marshall Howard Saville (1867–1935) was an American archeologist. Saville was born in Rockport, Massachusetts on June 24, 1867. He studied anthropology at Harvard (1889–1894), engaged in field work under F. W. Putnam, and made important discoveries among the mound builders in southern Ohio. After 1903 he was professor of American archeology at Columbia University.

Saville was a founding member of the Explorers Club, an organization formally established in 1905 and dedicated to promoting exploration and scientific investigation in the field.

He died on May 7, 1935.
