= Tuxtla Statuette =

2nd Century CE Epi-Olmec statuette

- Frontal view of the Tuxtla Statuette. Note the Mesoamerican Long Count calendar date of March 162 CE (8.6.2.4.17) down the front of the statuette.
- Material: Nephrite
- Discovered: 1902 in the west foothills of the Tuxtlas Mountains, Veracruz, Mexico
- Present location: Department of Anthropology, National Museum of Natural History, Smithsonian Institution, Washington, D.C.

The Tuxtla Statuette is a small rounded nephrite figurine about 6.5" high, and carved to resemble a squat, bullet-shaped human with a duck-like bill and wings. It is incised with glyphs of the Epi-Olmec or Isthmian script, two columns in the front and two in the back, one of the few extant examples of this very early Mesoamerican writing system. The front of the statuette is somewhat defaced and the glyphs there are only partially readable.

The human face carved into the stone is unremarkable except for the long bill that extends down to chest level. This bill has been identified as belonging to the boat-billed heron, a locally abundant bird along the Tabasco and southern Veracruz Gulf Coast. Raised wings or a wing-like cape envelop the body while feet have been incised into the base.

The Tuxtla Statuette is particularly notable in that its glyphs include the Mesoamerican Long Count calendar with a possible date of March 162 CE, which at its discovery in 1902 was the oldest Long Count date yet found. The glyphs are not fully readable. Initially a long count date of "8. 6. 2. 4. 17" (March 13th, 162 CE) was proposed. A product of the final century of the Epi-Olmec culture, the statuette is from the same region and period as La Mojarra Stela 1 and may refer to the same events or persons. Similarities between the Tuxtla Statuette and Cerro de las Mesas Monument 5, a boulder carved to represent a semi-nude figure with a duckbill-like buccal mask, have also been noted.

The Tuxtla Statuette was discovered in 1902 by a farmer, Pedro Mimendi, plowing his field in the west foothills of the Santiago Tuxtla in the Hacienda de Hueyapan de Mimend, Mexican state of Veracruz near Tres Zapotes. It was acquired by the Smithsonian Institution shortly thereafter, reputedly smuggled into New York hidden in a shipment of tobacco leaf. At the time, several Mayanists including Sylvanus Morley, could not believe that the statuette pre-dated the Maya and suggested that the date and text were inscribed much later than 162 CE. However, later discoveries, such as La Mojarra Stela 1 and Tres Zapotes Stela C, confirmed the antiquity of the statuette.

The Tuxtla Statuette is in the collections of the Department of Anthropology, National Museum of Natural History.

It has been proposed that there is a Tuxtla script, encoding the Tuxtlatec language, a branch of the Mixe–Zoque languages. This is based on 16 exemplars of which La Mojarra Stela 1 is the longest. A proposed decipherment of Epi-Olmec has the statuette dating to within 3 years before the Stela and referring to the same ruler and "The rites described on the statuette were performed on the sixth anniversary of the ruler's last recorded battle before accession".

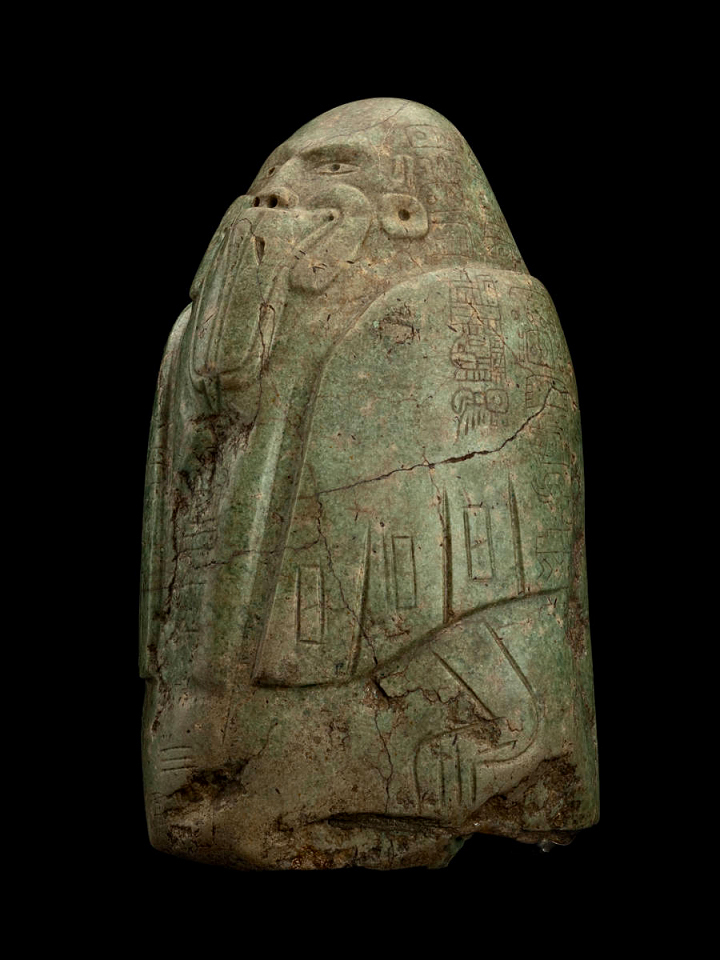
A side view of the Tuxtla Statuette

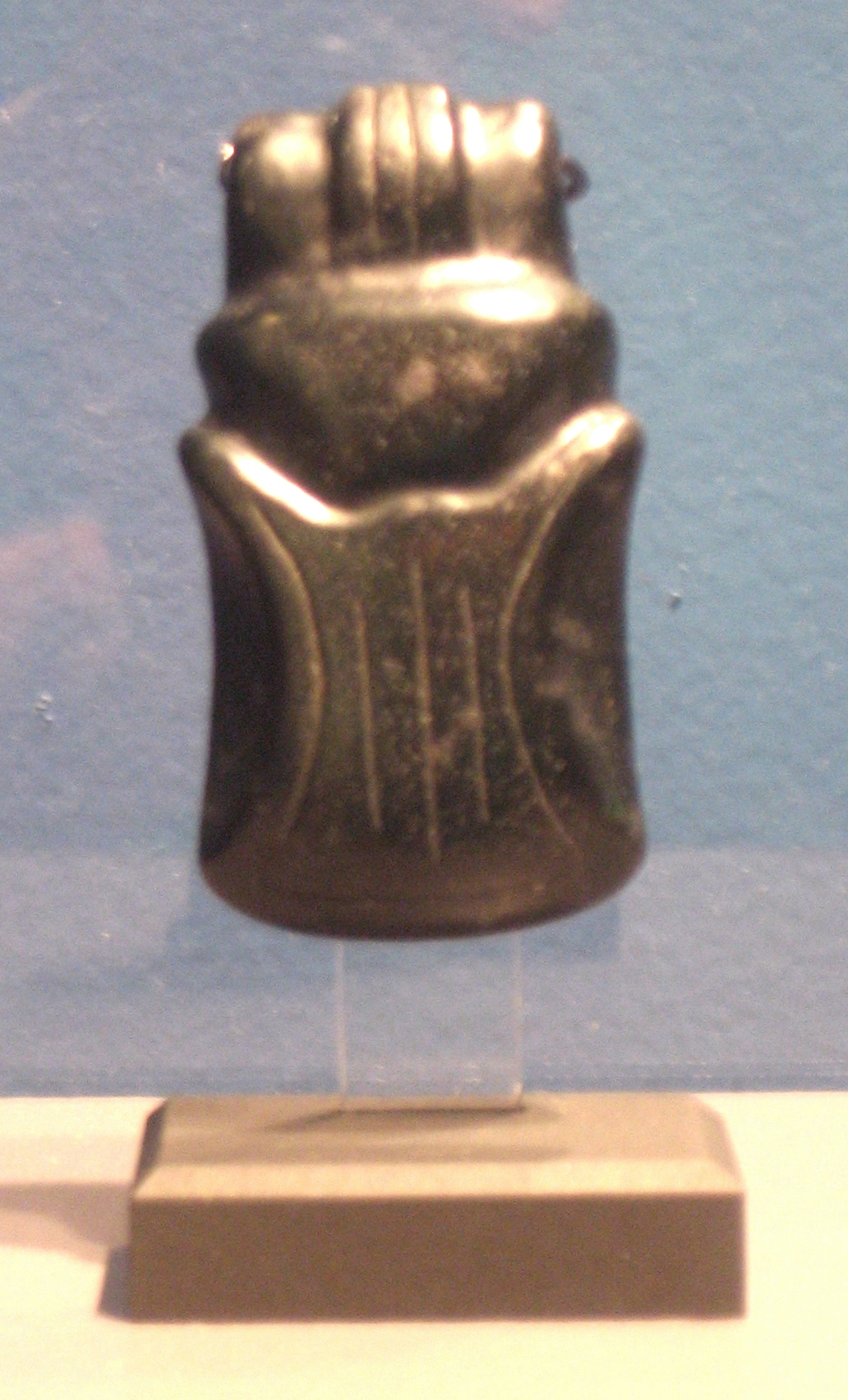
A black jade duckbill pendant from the Olmec culture, dated from 1000 BC to 300 BC, or at least 400 years earlier than the Tuxtla Statuette.
