= Epi-Olmec =

Epi-Olmec ("post-Olmec") may refer to:

- Epi-Olmec culture, pre-Columbian archaeological culture/area in the coastal Veracruz region of Mexico, ca. 300BCE–250CE
- Isthmian script, also known as Epi-Olmec script, a Mesoamerican writing system

== Contrast with ==
- Olmec, earlier and distinct Mesoamerican archaeological culture and tradition, dating ca. 1200–400 BCE
- Olmeca-Xicalanca, a Mesoamerican culture living in Mexico's Veracruz and Tabasco regions at the time of the 16thC Spanish conquest
