= Mesoamerican writing systems =

Mesoamerica, along with Mesopotamia and China, is one of three known places in the world where writing is thought to have developed independently. Mesoamerican scripts deciphered to date are a combination of logographic and syllabic systems. They are often called hieroglyphs due to the iconic shapes of many of the glyphs, a pattern superficially similar to Egyptian hieroglyphs. While Western languages distinguish graphic signs from writing, the distinction does not fit for Mesoamerican expressions, which continuously has both the painted and the written. Fifteen distinct writing systems have been identified in pre-Columbian Mesoamerica, many from a single inscription. The limits of archaeological dating methods make it difficult to establish which was the earliest and hence the progenitor from which the others developed. The best documented and deciphered Mesoamerican writing system, and the most widely known, is the classic Maya script. Earlier scripts with poorer and varying levels of decipherment include the Olmec hieroglyphs, the Zapotec script, and the Isthmian script, all of which date back to the 1st millennium BC. An extensive Mesoamerican literature has been conserved, partly in indigenous scripts and partly in postconquest transcriptions in the Latin script.

After the Spanish conquest of the Aztec Empire in 1521, Spanish colonial authorities and Catholic Church missionaries aimed to purge indigenous culture, religion and traditional institutions, which included the destruction of texts of Mesoamerican and pre-Columbian origin. However, some Mesoamerican texts were spared, particularly from the Yucatán of southern Mexico, recording the languages of the area. These surviving texts give anthropologists and historians valuable insight into the origins of Mesoamerican languages, culture, religion, and government. Languages recorded in Mesoamerican writing include Classical Maya, Classical Nahuatl, Zapotec, Mixtec, and various other languages, particularly of the Oto-Manguean and Uto-Aztecan families.

== Pre-Classic and Classic periods ==
In Mesoamerica, writing emerged during the Pre-classic Period, with Zapotec and Maya writing flourishing during the Classic Period.

The 62 glyphs of the Cascajal block

=== Olmec writing ===
Early Olmec ceramics show representations of something that may be codices, suggesting that amatl bark codices, and by extension well-developed writing, existed in Olmec times. It was also long thought that many of the glyphs present on Olmec monumental sculpture, such as those on the so-called "Ambassador Monument" (La Venta Monument 13), represented an early Olmec script. This suspicion was reinforced in 2002 by the announcement of the discovery of similar glyphs at San Andres.

In September 2006, a report published in Science magazine announced the discovery of the Cascajal block, a writing-tablet-sized block of serpentine with 62 characters unlike any yet seen in Mesoamerica. This block was discovered by locals in the Olmec heartland and was dated by the archaeologists to approximately 900 BCE based on other debris. If the authenticity and date can be verified, this will prove to be the earliest writing yet found in Mesoamerica.

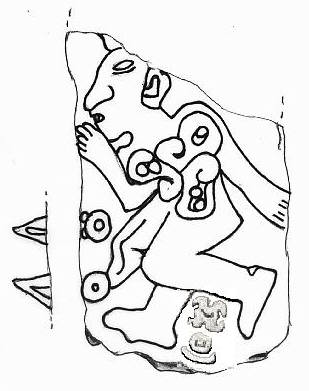
Monument 3 at San José Mogote. The two shaded glyphs between his legs are likely his name, Earthquake 1.

=== Zapotec writing ===
Another candidate for earliest writing system in Mesoamerica is the writing system of the Zapotec culture. Rising in the late Pre-Classic era after the decline of the Olmec civilization, the Zapotecs of present-day Oaxaca built an empire around Monte Albán. On a few monuments at this archaeological site, archaeologists have found extended text in a glyphic script. Some signs can be recognized as calendric information but the script as such remains undeciphered. Read in columns from top to bottom, its execution is somewhat cruder than that of the later Classic Maya and this has led epigraphers to believe that the script was also less phonetic than the largely syllabic Maya script. These are, however, speculations.

The earliest known monument with Zapotec writing is a "Danzante" stone, officially known as Monument 3, found in San José Mogote, Oaxaca. It has a relief of what appears to be a dead and bloodied captive with two glyphic signs between his legs, probably representing his name. First dated to 500–600 BCE, this was earlier considered the earliest writing in Mesoamerica. However, doubts have been expressed as to this dating, and the monument may have been reused. The Zapotec script went out of use only in the late Classic period.

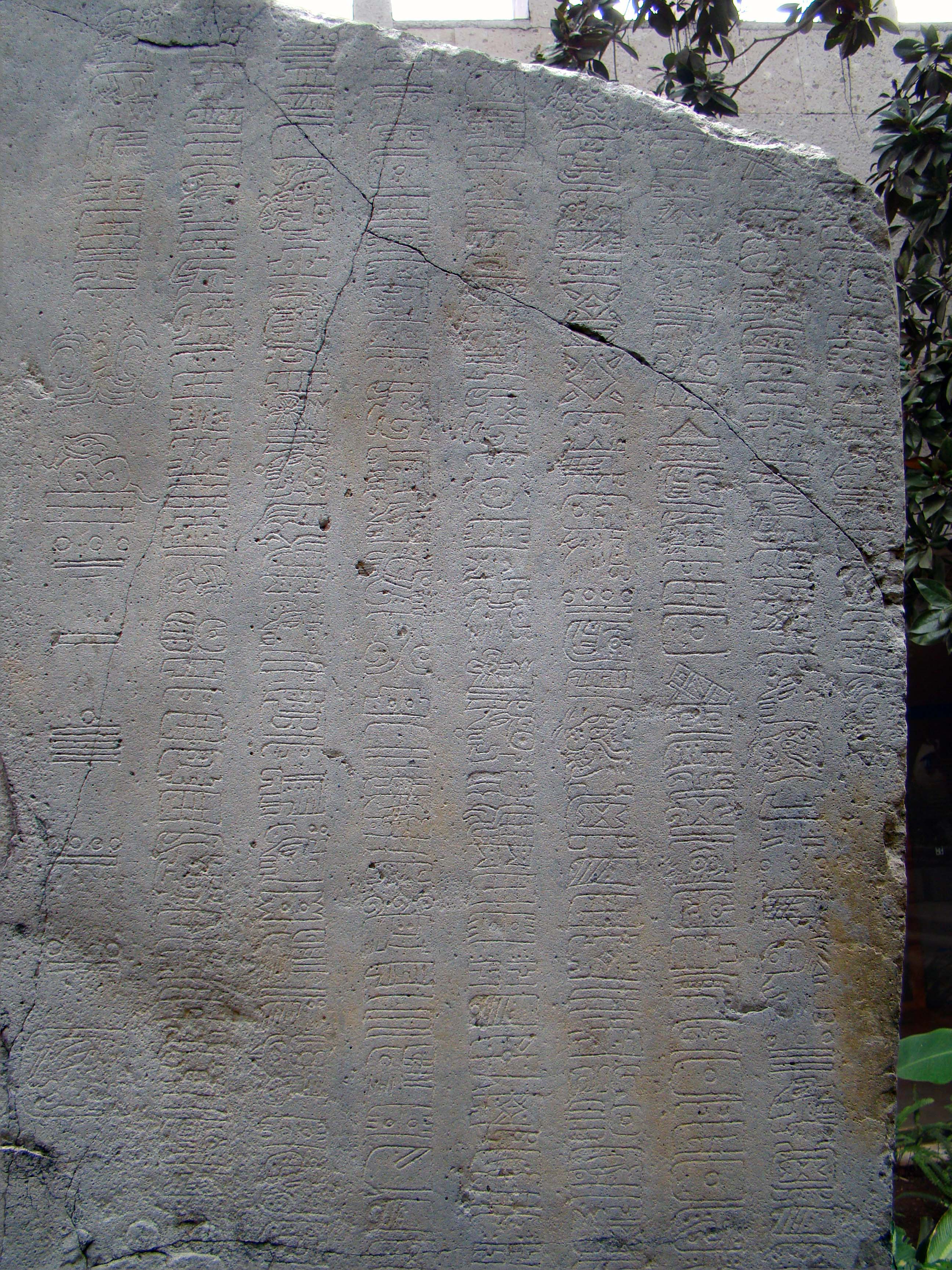
Detail showing glyphs from 2nd century CE La Mojarra Stela 1. The left column gives a Long Count date of 8.5.16.9.9, or 162 CE. The other columns are glyphs from the Epi-Olmec script.

Zapotec scribes were conflated with artists and were often called huezeequichi, meaning 'an artist on paper'. This suggests that writing may have developed out of an older artistic tradition, in which abstract concepts were represented with symbols, which later more concretely came to represent spoken language. The Zapotec developed a highly advanced 260-day ritual calendar, and a 365-day secular calendar from their knowledge in astronomy.

=== Epi-Olmec or Isthmian script ===
A small number of artifacts found in the Isthmus of Tehuantepec show examples of another early Mesoamerican writing system. They can be seen to contain calendric information but are otherwise undeciphered. The longest of these texts are on La Mojarra Stela 1 and the Tuxtla Statuette. The writing system used is very close to the Maya script, using affixal glyphs and Long Count dates, but is read only in one column at a time as is the Zapotec script. It has been suggested that this Isthmian or Epi-Olmec script is the direct predecessor of the Maya script, thus giving the Maya script a non-Maya origin. Another artifact with Epi-Olmec script is the Chiapa de Corzo stela which is the oldest monument of the Americas inscribed with its own date: the Long Count on the stela dates it to 36 BCE.

In a 1997 paper, John Justeson and Terrence Kaufman put forward a decipherment of Epi-Olmec. The following year, however, their interpretation was disputed by Stephen Houston and Michael D. Coe, who unsuccessfully applied Justeson and Kaufman's decipherment system against epi-Olmec script from the back of a hitherto unknown mask. The matter remains under dispute.

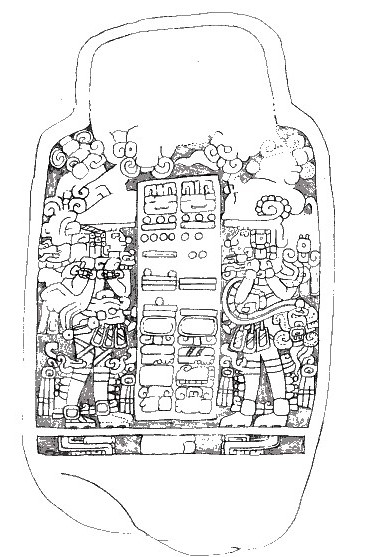
Stela 5 from Abaj Takalik

=== Abaj Takalik and Kaminaljuyú scripts ===
In the highland Maya archaeological sites of Abaj Takalik and Kaminaljuyú writing has been found dating to Izapa culture. It is likely that in this area in late Pre-Classic times an ancient form of a Mixe–Zoquean language was spoken, and the inscriptions found here may be in such a language rather than a Maya one. Some glyphs in this scripts are readable as they are identical to Maya glyphs but the script remains undeciphered. The advanced decay and destruction of these archaeological sites make it improbable that more monuments with these scripts will come to light making possible a decipherment.

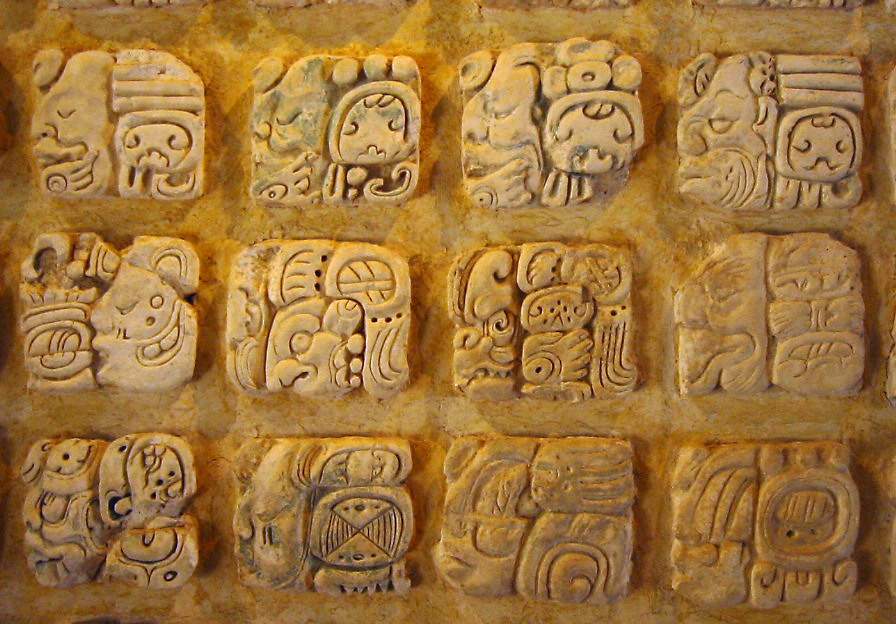
Maya glyphs in stucco at the Museo de sitio in Palenque, Mexico

=== Maya writing ===
Maya writing is attested from the mid-preclassic period in the center of Petén in the Maya lowlands, and lately scholars have suggested that the earliest Maya inscriptions may in fact be the oldest of Mesoamerica. The earliest inscriptions in an identifiably Maya script date back to 200–300 BCE. Early examples include the painted inscriptions at the caves of Naj Tunich and La Cobanerita in El Petén, Guatemala. The most elaborate inscriptions are considered to be those at classic sites like Palenque, Copán and Tikal.

The Maya script is generally considered to be the most fully developed Mesoamerican writing system, mostly because of its extraordinary aesthetics and because it has been partially deciphered. In Maya writing, logograms and syllable signs are combined. Around 700 different glyphs have been documented, with some 75% having been deciphered. Around 7000 texts in Maya script have been documented.

Maya writing first developed as only utilizing logograms, but later included the use of phonetic complements in order to differentiate between the semantic meanings of the logograms and for context that allows for syllabic spelling of words.

Post-classic inscriptions are found at the Yucatán peninsula in sites such as Chichén Itza and Uxmal but the style is not nearly as accomplished as the classic Maya inscriptions.

=== Other potential Mesoamerican writing systems ===
Two other potential writing systems of the pre-classic period have been found in Mesoamerica: The Tlatilco cylinder seal was found during the time frame of the Olmec occupation of Tlatilco, and appears to contain a non-pictographic script. The Chiapa de Corzo cylinder seal found at that location in Mexico also appears to be an example of an unknown Mesoamerican script.

Certain iconographic elements in Teotihuacano art have been considered as a potential script, although it is attested sparsely and in individual glyphs rather than texts. If it indeed is a writing system, it is "one whose usage is non-textual and only restricted to naming people and places". In this aspect, it resembles later Central Mexican writing systems such as Mixtec and Aztec.

Scholars have found evidence for the existence of scribes at the Teuchitlán culture's site of Huitzilapa. However their writing system did not survive the ravages of time and has not been recovered in the archaeological record.

== Post-Classic period ==
During the post-classic period, the Maya glyphic system continued to be used, but much less so. Other post-classic cultures such as the Aztec did not have fully developed writing systems, but instead used semasiographic writing.

=== Mixtec writing ===
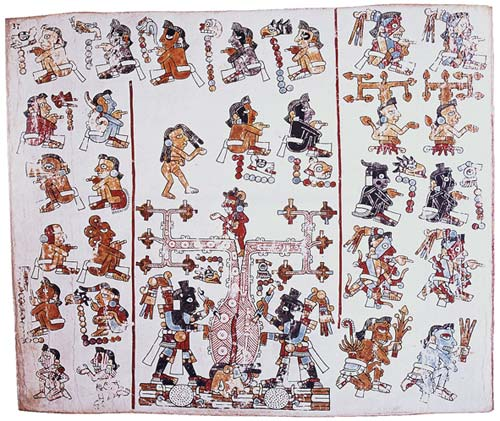
Line 37 of the Códice Vindobonensis or Yuta Tnoho

Mixtec writing emerged during the 13th century, much later than the systems previously mentioned. Mixtec is a semasiographic system that was used by the pre-Hispanic Mixtecs. Many of its characteristics were later adopted by the Mexica and Mixteca-Puebla writing systems. The origin of the Mixteca-Puebla is the subject of debate amongst experts. The Mixtec writing system consisted of a set of figurative signs and symbols that served as guides for storytellers as they recounted legends. These storytellers were usually priests and other members of the Mixtec upper class.

Mixtec writing has been categorized as being a mixture of pictorial and logographic, rather than a complete logogram system.

Mixtec writing has been preserved through various archaeological artifacts that have survived the passage of time and the destruction of the Spanish conquest. Among these objects are four pre-Hispanic codices written on tanned deer skin covered with stucco. These codices are read in boustrophedon, a zigzag style in which the reader follows red lines that indicate the way to read. Most of the current knowledge about the writing of the Mixtecans is due to the work of Alfonso Caso, who undertook the task of deciphering the code based on a set of pre-Columbian and colonial documents of the Mixtec culture.

Although the Mixtecs had a set of symbols that allowed them to record historical dates, they did not use the long count calendar characteristic of other southeast Mesoamerican writing systems. Instead, the codices that have been preserved record historical events of this pre-Columbian people, especially those events related to expansionism in the era of Ocho Venado, lord of Tilantongo.

=== Aztec writing ===
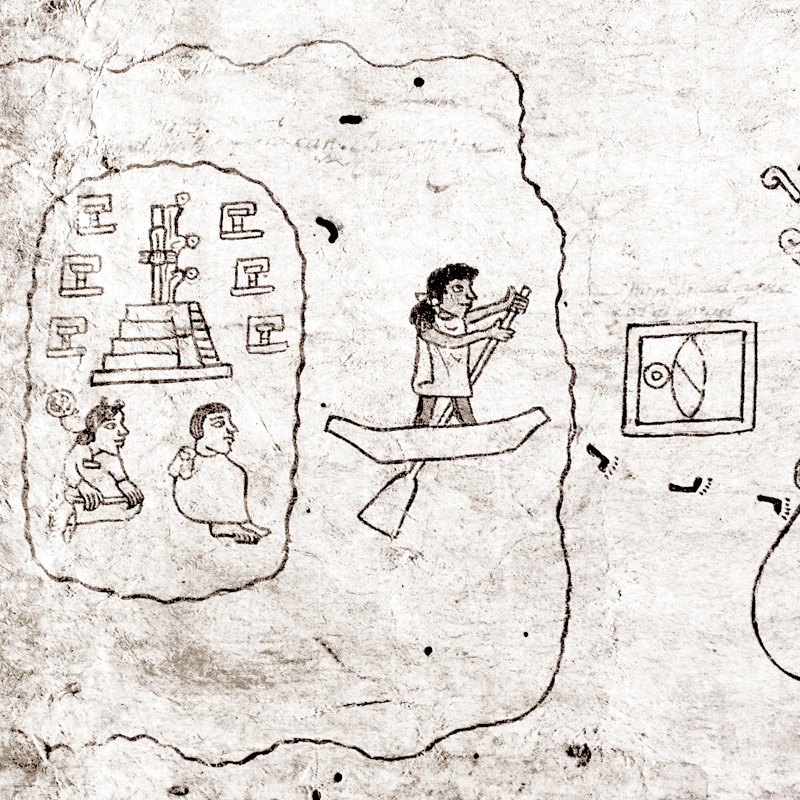
Detail of first page from the Aztec Boturini Codex, showing the use of semasiological writing combined with phonetic glyph elements.

The Aztec writing system is adopted from writing systems used in Central Mexico. It is related to Mixtec writing and both are thought to descend from Zapotec writing. The Aztecs used semasiographic writing, although they have been said to be slowly developing phonetic principles in their writing by the use of the rebus principle. Aztec name glyphs for example, do combine logographic elements with phonetic readings.

== Post-Columbian period ==
When Europeans arrived in the 16th century, they found several writing systems in use that drew from Olmec, Zapotec, and Teotihuacano traditions. Books and other written material were commonplace in Mesoamerica when Hernán Cortés arrived in 1519. Archaeologists have found inside elite Mayan homes personal objects inscribed with the owners' names. In public areas large stone pillars and inscribed monuments have been found clearly meant for the general public.

Early post-Columbian sources preserve and document aspects of indigenous literature (e.g., Ximenez's manuscript of the Popol Vuh) and writing (Diego de Landa's Relación de las cosas de Yucatán contained Maya calendar signs and a syllabary). As European Franciscan missionaries arrived they found that the Cholutecans used the rebus principle as a way to translate information into Latin as a teaching aid for the natives to learn Christian prayers. A number of colonial-era Aztec codices are preserved, most notably the Codex Mendoza, the Florentine Codex, and the works by Diego Durán. Codex Mendoza (around 1541) is a mixed pictorial, alphabetic Spanish manuscript. The Florentine Codex, compiled 1545–1590 by Franciscan friar Bernardino de Sahagún includes a history of the Spanish conquest of the Aztec Empire from the Mexica viewpoint, with bilingual Nahuatl/Spanish alphabetic text and illustrations by native artists. There are also the works of Dominican Diego Durán (before 1581), who drew on indigenous pictorials and living informants to create illustrated texts on history and religion. The colonial-era codices often contain Aztec pictograms or other pictorial elements.

Later indigenous literature employed Latin script exclusively, e.g., the Books of Chilam Balam that date from the 17th c. onwards. Already by the mid-16th c., use of the Latin script for Mesoamerican languages seems to have been well established. For writing Maya, colonial manuscripts conventionally adopt a number of special characters and diacritics thought to have been invented by Francisco de la Parra around 1545. The original manuscript of the Popol Vuh is also dated to this period (but only indirectly, by its content). The first major work of Mayan literature known to be originally written in Latin script are the Annals of the Cakchiquels (since 1571).

Since the mid-1990s, Maya intellectuals attended workshops organized by Linda Schele to learn about Maya writing, and with digital technologies, Maya writing may indeed face a resurrection. Most notably, this includes work on the representation of Maya glyphs in Unicode since 2016 (not yet concluded by 2020). The goal of encoding Maya hieroglyphs in Unicode is to facilitate the modern use of the script. For representing the degree of flexibility and variation of classical Maya, the expressiveness of Unicode is insufficient (e.g., wrt. the representation of infixes), so, for philological applications, different technologies are required.

== See also ==
- Canadian Aboriginal syllabics
- Cherokee syllabary
- Quipu
