= Cerro de las Mesas =

Coordinates: 18°43′N 96°09′W

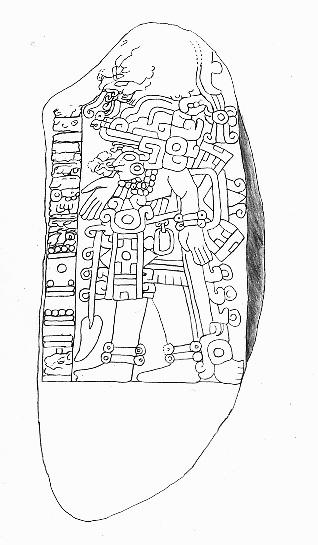
Stela 6, from Cerro de las Mesas. Note the Long Count date of 9.1.12.14.10 (April 468 CE) at the lower left. The glyphs above the date are one of the few, and latest, Epi-Olmec script texts yet discovered.

Cerro de las Mesas, meaning "hill of the altars" in Spanish, is an archaeological site in the Mexican state of Veracruz, in the Mixtequilla area of the Papaloapan River basin. It was a prominent regional center from 600 BCE to 900 CE, and a regional capital from 300 CE to 600 CE.

Located about 50 km (31 mi) due south of Veracruz City, Cerro de las Mesas is on the west edge of what had been the Olmec heartland. Rising to prominence after the decline of the Olmec civilization's culture, some researchers consider Cerro de las Mesas, along with similar sites like La Mojarra and Tres Zapotes, to be a center of epi-Olmec culture, a successor culture to the Olmecs, and one that itself gave way to Classic Veracruz culture in the 3rd century CE.

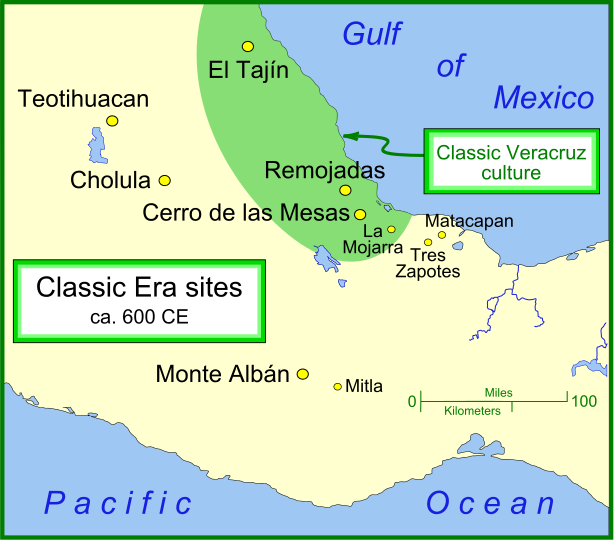
Cerro de las Mesas and other important Classic Era settlements.

The site contains a man-made lagoon as well as hundreds of artificial mounds, usually in groups, often clustered with a long and a conical mound. These mound groups were likely built during the epi-Olmec period, 400 BCE to 300 CE. It was also during this period that the influence of Teotihuacan appears in the archaeological record.

Sometime later, during the Classic period, a cache of some 800 jade items, some dating from Olmec civilization hundreds of years earlier, were buried at the base of the large mound of the central group.

Cerro de las Mesas is home to many stele — artistic stone slabs — several of which contain portrait carvings. Four of these stele — numbers 5, 6, 8, and 15 — contain what are likely to be pieces of Epi-Olmec or Isthmian script.
