= La Mojarra Stela 1 =

Mesoamerican stela

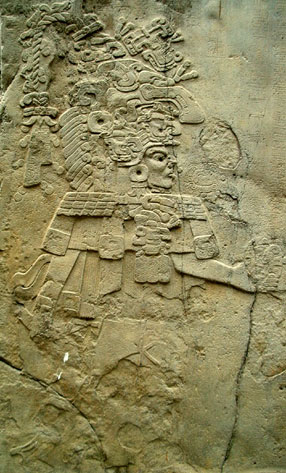
- Left side image of La Mojarra Stela 1, showing a person identified as "Harvester Mountain Lord"
- Material: Limestone
- Created: 2nd century
- Discovered: 1986 in the Acula River near La Mojarra, Veracruz, Mexico
- Present location: Xalapa Museum of Anthropology

La Mojarra Stela 1 is a Mesoamerican carved monument (stela) dating from 156 CE (2nd century CE). It was discovered in 1986, pulled from the Acula River near La Mojarra, Veracruz, Mexico, not far from the Tres Zapotes archaeological site. The 4 1/2-foot-wide (1.4 m) by 6 1/2-foot-high (2.0 m), four-ton limestone slab contains about 535 glyphs of the Isthmian script. One of Mesoamerica's earliest known written records, this Epi-Olmec culture monument not only recorded this ruler's achievements, but placed them within a cosmological framework of calendars and astronomical events.

The right side of the stone features a full-length portrait of a man in an elaborate headdress and costume, although the bottom half of the carving is very badly weathered. Above the figure, 12 short columns of glyphs have been etched into the stone, matched by eight longer columns to the figure's right. Among these glyphs are two Mesoamerican Long Count calendar dates which correspond to May 143 CE and July 156 CE. The monument is an early example of the type of stela which later became common commemorating rulers of Maya sites in the Classic era.

== Description and interpretation ==
The figure engraved onto Stela 1 is complex and not easily interpreted. Pool describes the figure as follows:

His elaborate headdress forms the head of a hook-billed bird supernatural. A "Jester God" head with buccal mask sprouts from the bird-deity's nose, and a stylized shark with serrated fin is attached to the top of the headdress, its bifurcated tail hanging down behind. Four smaller sharks swim up the main shark's rope-like notochord. Smaller bird deity masks appear below the main one and on the pectoral ornament that lies on the ruler's breast over his feather cape. Glyphs symbolizing his exalted office adorn his arms and legs.

Prof. Philip Arnold has tentatively identified the stylized sharks as the Olmec Fish/Shark Monster, a symbol of rulership.

According to Mary Ellen Miller, the figure wears the headdress of the Principal Bird Deity. Bird deities were often featured on stelae of this period, and can be seen on Izapa Stela 4 as well on monuments at Kaminaljuyu, Takalik Abaj, and Zaculeu.

The Tuxtla Statuette, a small 6-inch-high greenstone sculpture (150 mm), also portrays a human dressed as a bird. It comes from the same culture and period as Stela 1, and both feature Isthmian script glyphs. These two artifacts were found roughly 70 km (43 mi) apart and their Long Count dates are separated by only six years. They may even refer to the same person.

== Discovery and decipherment ==
For some years after discovery, the monument was in storage in the Museo de Antropología in Xalapa. In November 1995, as the monument was being prepared for display, a previously neglected series of glyphs was noticed on one side in eroded but still partially recognizable condition.

In 1993, and again in 1997, after discovery of the new column of glyphs, John Justeson and Terrence Kaufman put forward a proposed decipherment of the glyphs. This decipherment names the figure depicted as "Harvester Mountain Lord", and describes his ascension to kingship, a solar eclipse, appearances of Venus, warfare, and an attempted usurpation, human sacrifice (perhaps Harvester Mountain Lord's brother-in-law) and Harvester Mountain Lord's own bloodletting.

This decipherment has been disputed by Michael D. Coe and Stephen D. Houston, among others. Resolution of this debate will likely need to await further archaeological discoveries.

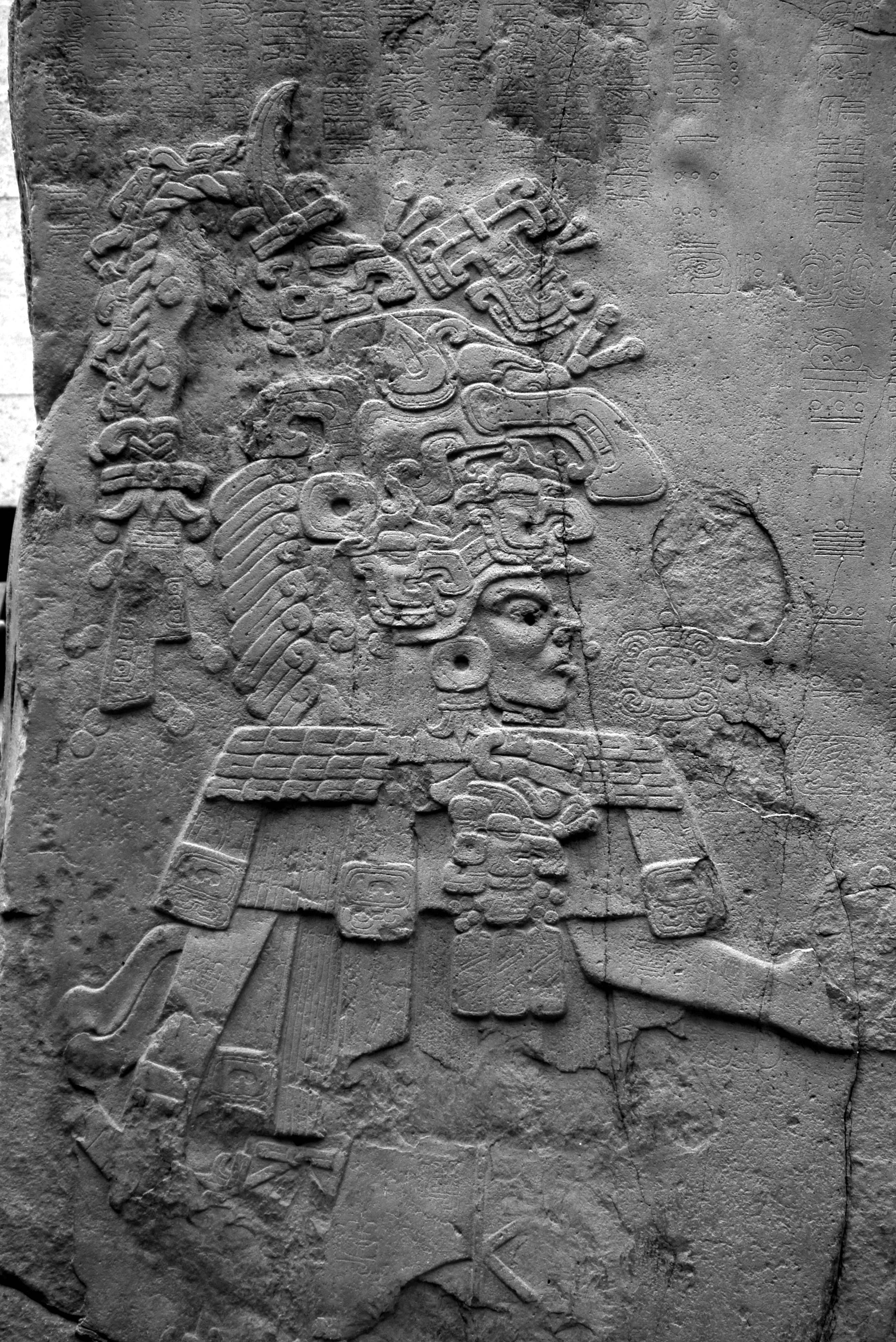
Detail of the central character of the sculpture

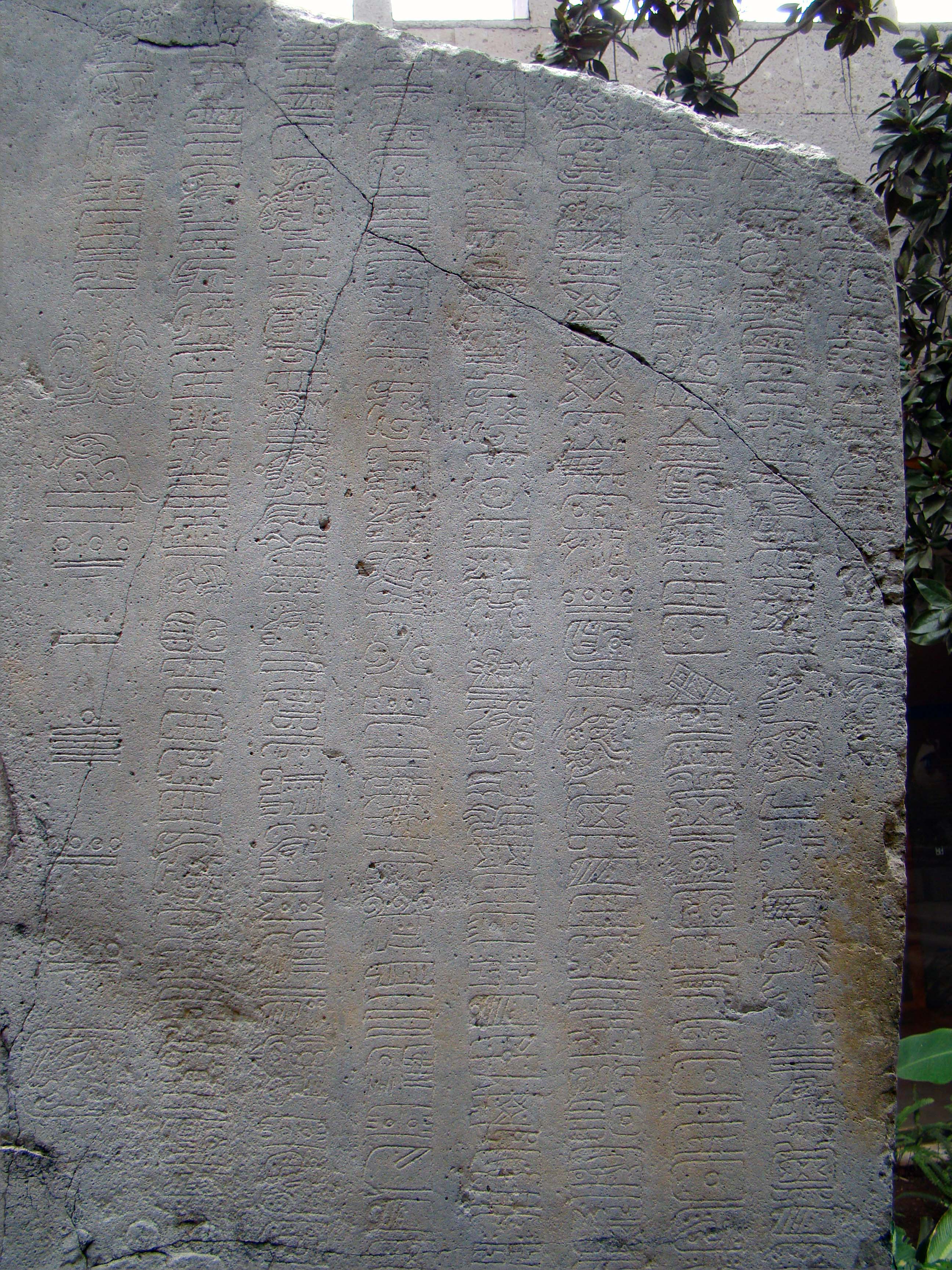
Detail of the inscriptions top view

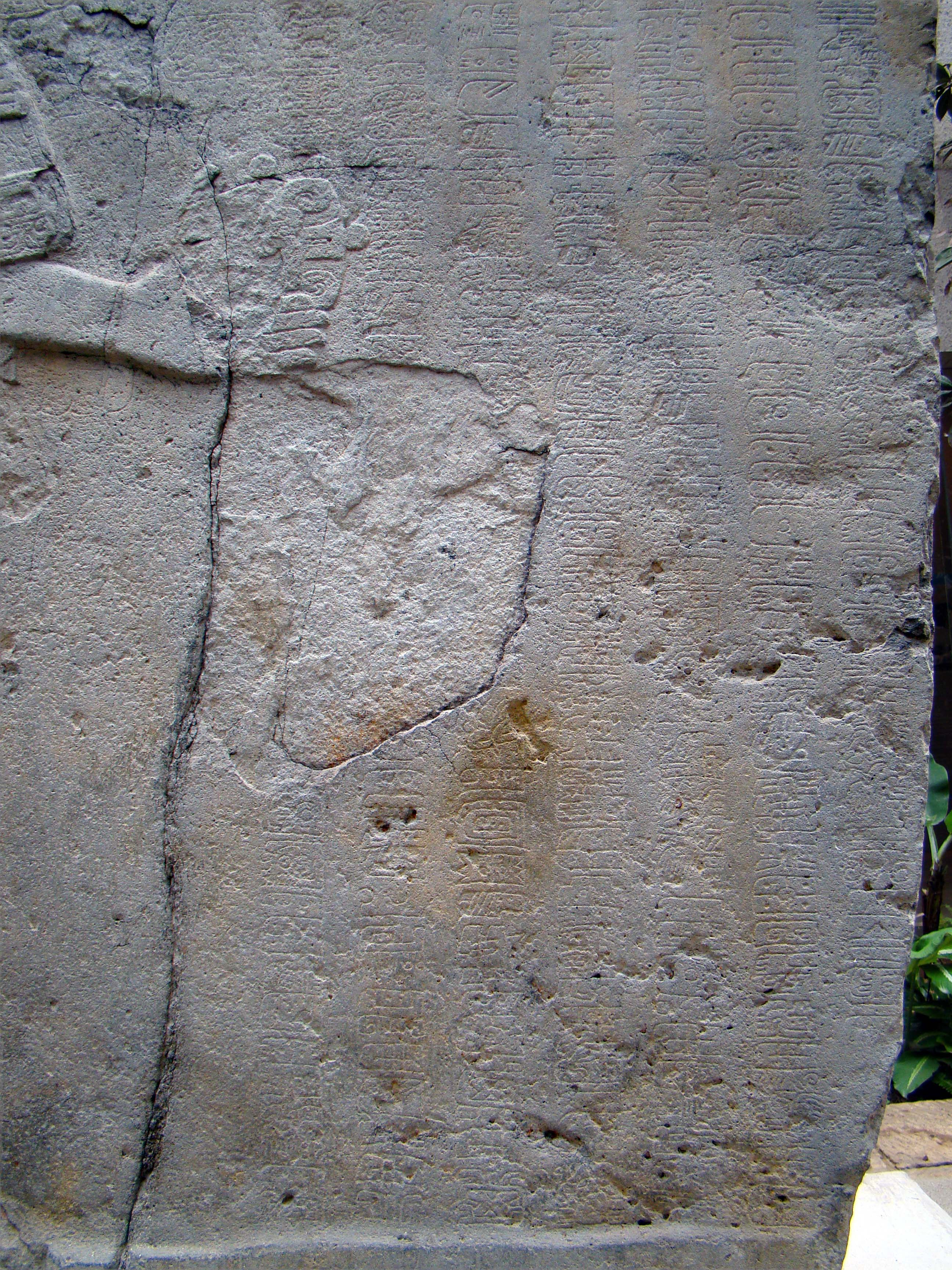
Detail of the inscriptions bottom view

== See also ==
- Detail showing one of the two Long Count dates.
