= Zapotec script =

Mesoamerican writing system

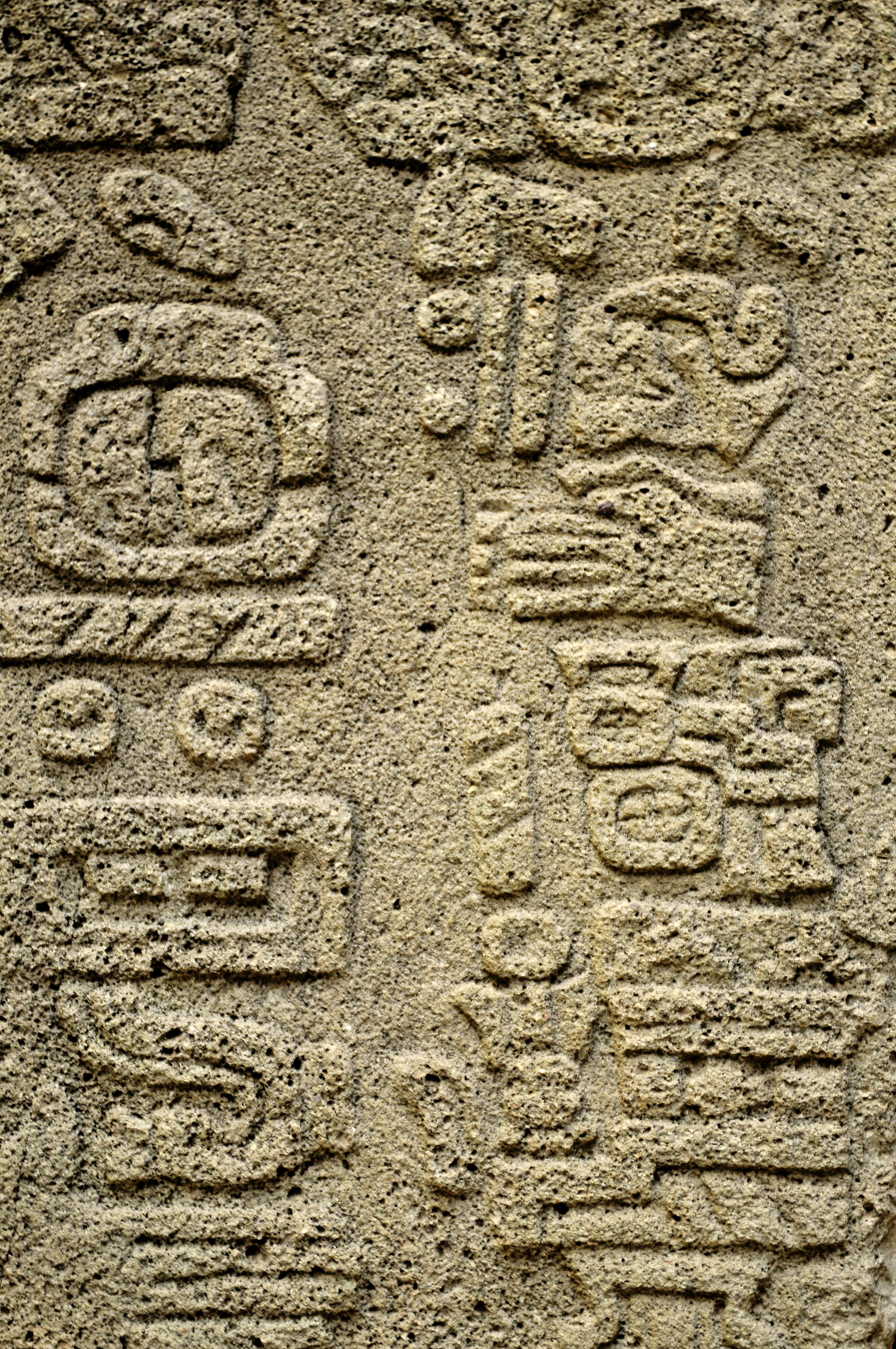
- Zapotec writing relief in the Site Museum of Monte Albán. Oaxaca, Mexico
- Script type: Undeciphered
- Period: 5th century BCE to 8th century CE
- Direction: Top to bottom
- Languages: Zapotec languages

Related scripts
- Parent systems: Isthmian script?: Zapotec script
- Sister systems: Isthmian script?; Mayan script?

The Zapotec script is the writing system of the Zapotec culture and represents one of the earliest writing systems in Mesoamerica. Rising in the late Pre-Classic era after the decline of the Olmec civilization, the Zapotecs of present-day Oaxaca built an empire around Monte Albán. One characteristic of Monte Albán is the large number of carved stone monuments one encounters throughout the plaza. There and at other sites, archaeologists have found extended text in a glyphic script.

Some signs can be recognized as calendar information but the script as such remains undeciphered (if not undecipherable). Read in columns from top to bottom, its execution is somewhat cruder than that of the later Maya script and this has led epigraphers to believe that the script was also less phonetic than the largely syllabic Maya.

According to Urcid (2005), the script was originally a logo-syllabic system and was probably developed for an ancient version of contemporary Zapotecan languages, but its application to language varieties other than "Ancient Zapotec" encouraged the development of logophonic traits.

== Origins ==
For some time, San Jose Mogote monument 3 (see below) has been considered among the earliest evidence for writing in Mesoamerica, roughly contemporary with La Venta Monument 13, and only slightly later than the San Andres glyphs (both representing possible Olmec writing), but well before Epi-Olmec (Isthmian) script. However,

[t]he early evidence of writing in Oaxaca does not necessarily imply that the Zapotecs invented the first Mesoamerican system of phonetic writing. The nature of the archaeological record generates differential preservation of the media through which writing was probably conveyed, and since it is plausible that early scribes used as well perishable materials like wood, cloth, bark paper, and deer hides, several aspects of the origin of writing and its early societal uses in Oaxaca and in Mesoamerica in general may lay beyond our reach.

— Urcid (2005: 5)

With possible calendar dates in San Andres (around 650 BCE) and San Jose Mogote (before 500 BCE), it seems that the foundations of calendar and numeral notations, as well as naming by calendar dates have been widely used in Mesoamerica before the middle of the first millennium BCE.

== San Jose Mogote Monument 3 ("Danzante") ==
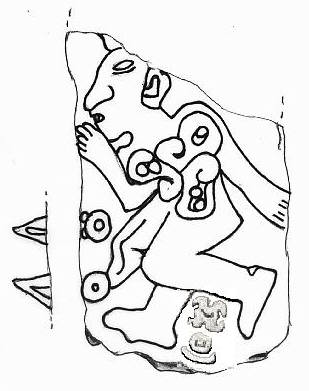
Monument 3 at San Jose Mogote. The two shaded glyphs between his legs are likely his name, Earthquake 1.

Monument 3 (also described as Danzante, lit. "dancer") from San Jose Mogote, Oaxaca, is considered to contain the earliest example of Zapotec writing. Placed as a doorstep to the ceremonial structure, it has a relief of what appears to be a dead and bloodied captive. The 19th century notion that such monuments, also found at Monte Albán, represent dancers is now largely discredited, are now seen to clearly represent tortured, sacrificed war prisoners.

Glyphs on the San Jose Mogote Danzante depict drops of blood and a possible calendar day-name "1 Earthquake." By 500 BCE, San José Mogote's 1000 years of dominance ended, and it was relegated to the status of a lesser community that fell under Monte Albán's control. The monument is thus dated before 500 BCE, and it was initially considered the earliest writing in Mesoamerica.

== At Monte Albán ==
=== Period I (500–200 BCE) ===
With the emergence of Monte Albán as the area's main city by 500 BCE, monuments with similar danzantes figures were erected at the site. Dating to the earliest period of occupation at the site, these monuments may depict leaders of competing centers and villages captured by Monte Albán, some identified by name. Over 300 “Danzantes” stones have been recorded to date, and some of the better preserved ones can be viewed at the site's museum.

=== Period II (200 BCE – 250 CE) ===
A different type of carved stones is found on Monte Albán Building J in the center of the Main Plaza. Inserted within the building walls are over 40 large carved slabs dating to Monte Albán II and depicting place-names, occasionally accompanied by additional writing and in many cases characterized by upside-down heads. Alfonso Caso was the first to identify these stones as "conquest slabs", likely listing places the Monte Albán elites claimed to have conquered and/or controlled. Some of the places listed on Building J slabs have been tentatively identified, and in one case (the Cañada de Cuicatlán region in northern Oaxaca) Zapotec conquest has been confirmed through archaeological survey and excavations. However, more recently, the tentative identifications have been contested.

Apparently, the writing system of Monte Albán began to decline in its usage by the end of period II.

=== Periods IIIA and IIIB (250–700 CE) ===
During the Early Classic (period IIIA, 250-450 CE), writing at Monte Albán became largely limited to calendrical sequences, proper names and toponyms, whereas iconography seems to be used for other purposes. This tendency continued and ultimately lead to the abandonment of the system:

The late monuments of Period IIIB (c. a .d . 450-700) exhibit a devastating collapse of the stylistic conventions and structural organization so evident in the works of earlier periods. As in the following, politically post-Monte Alban, Period IV (c. a .d . 700-950), calendrically oriented information alone, including names of individuals, is as abundant and important in Central Oaxaca as at any point in the development of Zapotec writing, though now lacking (...) ordered and complementary date sequences ...

— Whittaker (1992, p.6)

== Wider usage and development ==
The Zapotec script spread widely in southwestern Mesoamerica, possibly as a reflex of hegemonic interests and/or the emergence increasingly wider networks of interaction among the elites. The westernmost extent of Zapotec script is the Pacific coast of Oaxaca and Guerrero, with most inscribed material dating from 600 - 900 CE. As a result of its spread, Zapotec writing became multilingual and maximized its logophonic traits, whereas phonetic writing was minimized over time and eventually confined to proper names and toponyms. Traditionally, this process of `devolution' has also been connected to the rising importance of Teotihuacan.

At its eastern fringe of extension, it has been suggested that Zapotec writing influenced scribal traditions in the Isthmus of Tehuantepec and Chiapas. At its northwestern boundary, Zapotec writing and Central Mexican influences converged in the development of the Ñuiñe script.

The Zapotec script appears to have gone out of use in the late Classic period. Most inscriptions were carved before 700 CE, and no later than the 10th century, it was replaced by another form of writing that ultimately developed into later Mixtec and Aztec writing systems. It is possible, however, that these were influenced by Zapotec writing.
