= Epi-Olmec culture =

Archaeological culture in Mexico

Important Epi-Olmec sites

The Epi-Olmec culture was a cultural area in the central region of the present-day Mexican state of Veracruz. Concentrated in the Papaloapan River basin, a culture that existed during the Late Formative period, from roughly 300 BCE to roughly 250 CE. Epi-Olmec was a successor culture to the Olmec, hence the prefix "epi-" or "post-". Although Epi-Olmec did not attain the far-reaching achievements of that earlier culture, it did realize, with its sophisticated calendrics and writing system, a level of cultural complexity unknown to the Olmecs.

Tres Zapotes and eventually Cerro de las Mesas were the largest Epi-Olmec centers though neither would reach the size and importance of the great Olmec cities before them nor El Tajín after them. Other Epi-Olmec sites of note include El Mesón, Lerdo de Tejada, La Mojarra, Bezuapan, and Chuniapan de Abajo.

== Cultural context ==
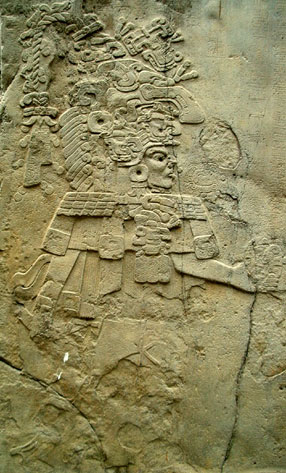
Left side image of La Mojarra Stela 1 showing a person identified as "Harvester Mountain Lord", 156 CE

The rise of the Epi-Olmec culture on the western edge of the Olmec heartland coincides with the depopulation of the eastern half of the Olmec heartland and the decline of the Olmec culture in general. The Epi-Olmec culture represented a gradual transformation of, rather than a sharp break with, the Olmec culture. Many Olmec motifs, for example, were employed by its successor culture. Tres Zapotes, one of the largest Olmec sites, continued as a regional center under the Epi-Olmec culture. And daily life for the non-elites continued much the same: subsistence farming with opportunistic hunting and fishing, wattle-and-daub houses, thatched roofs, and bell-shaped storage pits.

On the other hand, the Late Formative period saw a widespread decline in trade and other interregional interaction throughout Mesoamerica, along with a marked decline in the use of exotic prestige items, such as greenstone beads. It has been proposed these exotic trade goods were replaced as prestige items by locally created luxury goods, such as cotton cloth and towering headdresses. The decline in interregional interaction and trade was not uniform however: in particular, interaction with cultures across the Isthmus of Tehuantepec increased, and an increase in the import of obsidian has also been detected.

In contrast to earlier Olmec art, Epi-Olmec art displays a general loss of detail and quality. Ceramic figurines were less realistically detailed, and the basalt monuments and stelae at Tres Zapotes lacked the artisanship, refinement, and detail of the earlier San Lorenzo and La Venta work.

Based on the decentralized placement of mounds groups and monumental sculpture at Tres Zapotes, the Epi-Olmec hierarchy is assumed to have been less centralized than its Olmec predecessor, perhaps featuring a factionalized ruling assembly rather than a single ruler.

(See also Tres Zapotes site layout and societal organization)

== Epi-Olmec sculpture ==
=== Script and calendrics ===
While the depiction of what appear to be historical events can be seen in La Venta Stela 3 ("Uncle Sam") and Monument 13 ("The Ambassador"), Olmec sculpture was more pre-occupied with the portraits of rulers, as is shown for example in the 17 colossal heads. In contrast, Epi-Olmec monuments show a dramatic increasing concern with historicity, culminating in the eventual appearance of dated transcriptions.

These dated transcriptions were made possible by the Epi-Olmec culture's very early use of the Long Count calendar as well as a very early writing system, the Epi-Olmec or Isthmian script. The Isthmian script appears on several Epi-Olmec sculptures including La Mojarra Stela 1, the Tuxtla Statuette, and Tres Zapotes Stela C, each of which also contains a very early Long Count date. These Epi-Olmec texts were the most detailed of this era in Mesoamerica.

While neither the Isthmian script nor the Long Count calendar were confined to the Epi-Olmec culture, their use, particularly in combination, is one of its hallmarks.

=== Subject matter ===
Whereas contemporaneous Izapan monuments, some 330 miles (500 km) to the southeast, display mythic and religious subjects, Epi-Olmec monuments glorified rulers. La Mojarra Stela 1, for example, shows a ruler in an elaborate outfit and headdress. Justeson and Kaufman's translation of the accompanying Isthmian script gives the figure's name as Harvester Mountain Lord and the script tells of his rise to power, warfare, a solar eclipse, his own bloodletting, and a "dripping sacrifice", perhaps of his brother-in-law.

Similar Epi-Olmec monuments featuring finely dressed figures with towering, flowing headdresses include the Alvarado Stela and El Mesón Stela 1. Unlike the La Mojarra Stela 1, these two monuments also show a subordinate, and likely intimidated, smaller figure. Some badly eroded Isthmian script glyphs may appear on the Alvarado Stela. El Mesón Stela 1 has no text.

This "exalted ruler" monumental art later became common in the Maya lands to the east during the Classic era.

== Final transformation ==
By 250 CE, Cerro de las Mesas, Remojadas, and other sites further north along the Veracruz coast had eclipsed Tres Zapotes. Although Tres Zapotes would continue into the Classic era, its heyday had passed and Epi-Olmec had given way to the Classic Veracruz culture.
