= La Mojarra =

Archaeological site in Mexico

Coordinates: 18.6153°N 95.7417°W

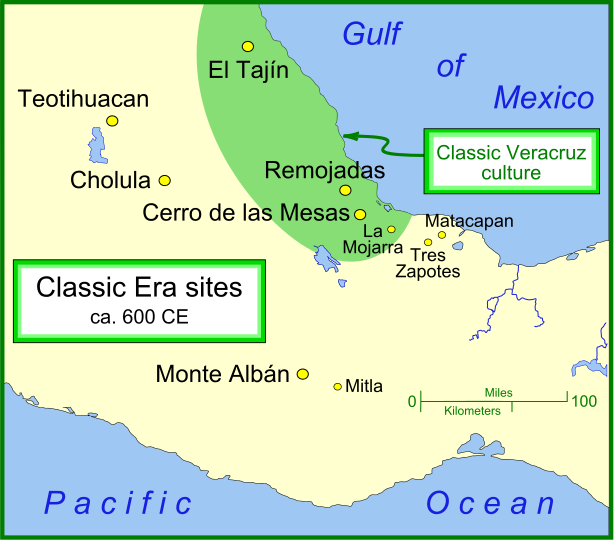
La Mojarra and other Classic era sites.

La Mojarra is an archaeological site in the Mexican state of Veracruz, located near Gulf Coast, at a bend in the Acula River. It was continually occupied from the late Formative period (ca. 300 BCE) until perhaps as late as 1000 CE.

Not a large site, La Mojarra has been little excavated. It covers roughly 1 km^{2} and consists of small mounds and a modest plaza. Three kilns have been unearthed, which fire locally used orange pottery.

Nonetheless, La Mojarra and environs have yielded two important Epi-Olmec culture artifacts: La Mojarra Stela 1 and the Tuxtla Statuette. Both of these artifacts contain what has been classified as Epi-Olmec script as well as very early Long Count calendar dates.
