= Bloodletting in Mesoamerica =

Ritualized practice of self-cutting in Mesoamerica

Bloodletting was the ritualized practice of self-cutting or piercing of an individual's body that served a number of ideological and cultural functions within ancient Mesoamerican societies, in particular the Maya. When performed by ruling elites, the act of bloodletting was crucial to the maintenance of sociocultural and political structure. Bound within the Mesoamerican belief systems, bloodletting was used as a tool to legitimize the ruling lineage's socio-political position and, when enacted, was important to the perceived well-being of a given society or settlement.

== Description ==
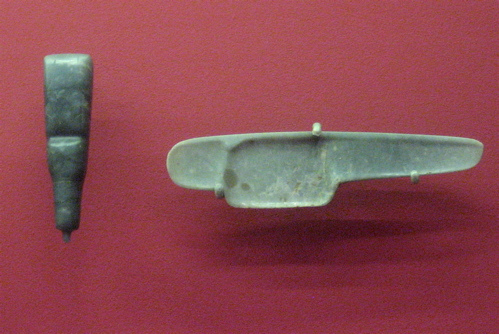
Mexico, probably Guerrero, Olmec Blood-letter Handle, 1000-600BC

Bloodletting was performed by piercing a soft body part, generally the tongue, and scattering the blood or collecting it on amate, which was subsequently burned. The act of burning the sacrificed blood symbolized the transferral of the offering to the gods via its transformation into the rising smoke.

Piercing was accomplished using obsidian prismatic blades, stingray spines, or shark's teeth. Under some circumstances, a rope with attached thorns or obsidian flakes would be pulled through the tongue.

Jade or stone spines and teeth have been found in the archaeological record. Some of these jade artifacts have rather dull points but might have been used once the initial cut was made, or might purely be ritualistic objects not used in actual bloodletting.

The location of the bloodletting on the body often correlated with an intended result or a corresponding symbolic representation. For example, drawing blood from the genitals, especially the male sex organs, would be done with the intent of increasing or representing human fertility. Other interpretations for genital bloodletting were for elites to support transitioning seasons to have fertile lands, which served as ritual acts to the gods.

== Ritual performance ==
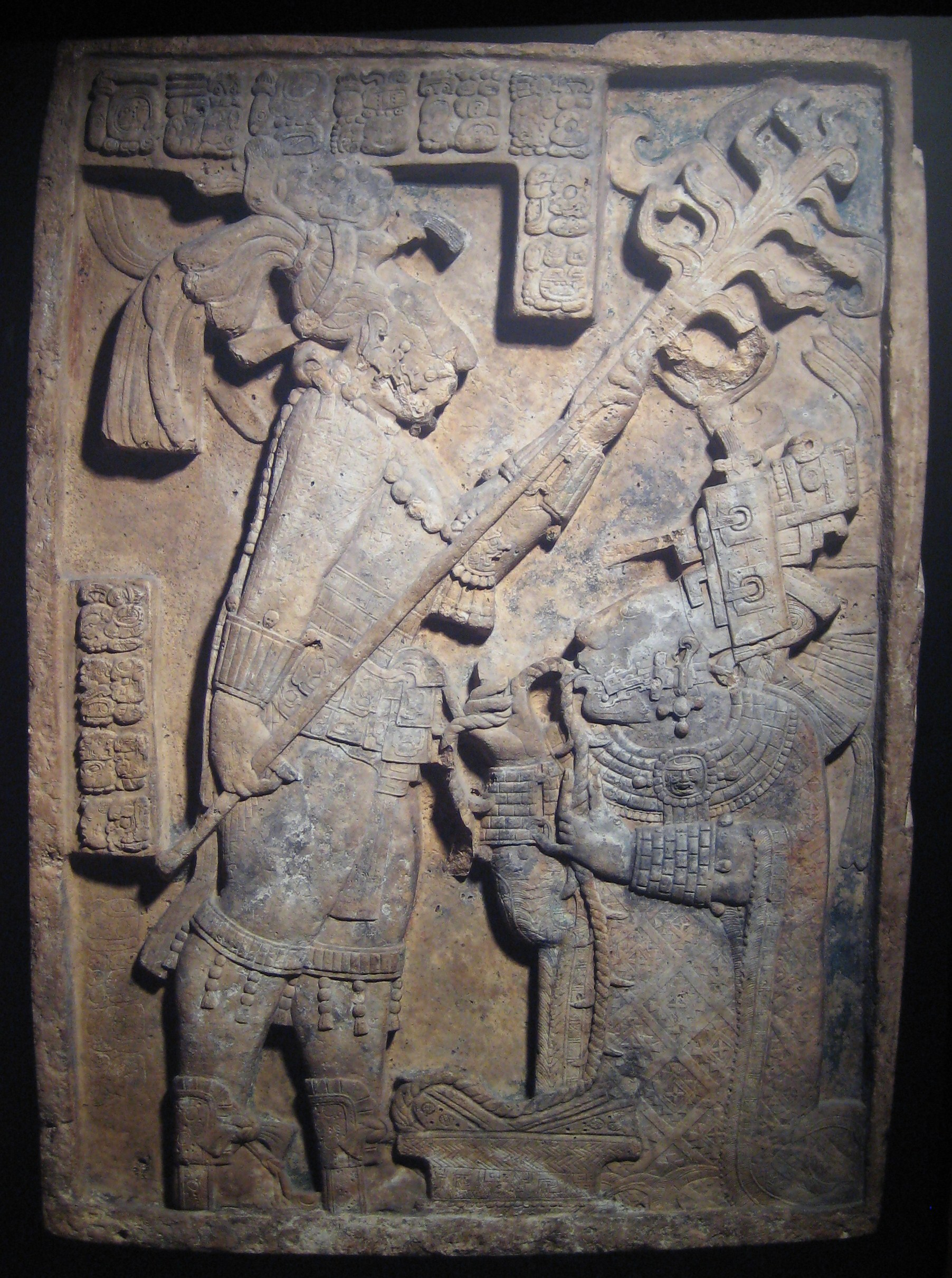
Lintel 24 at Yaxchilan, depicting Lady Xoc drawing a barbed rope through her tongue.

Ritualized bloodletting was typically performed by elites, settlement leaders, and religious figures (e.g., shamans) within contexts visible to the public. The rituals were enacted on the summits of pyramids or on elevated platforms that were usually associated with broad and open plazas or courtyards (where the masses could congregate and view the bloodletting). This was done so as to demonstrate the connection the person performing the auto-sacrifice had with the sacred sphere and, as such, a method used to maintain political power by legitimizing their prominent social, political, and/or ideological position. Evidence suggests that group or ceremonial bloodletting was held for young men in the Terminal Classic and Postclassic periods who were entering adulthood to learn about sexuality and fertility for marriage.

While usually carried out by a ruling male, prominent females are also known to have performed the act. The El Perú tomb of a female (called the "Queen's Tomb") contains among its many grave goods a ceremonial stingray spine associated with her genital region.

One of the best-known lintels from Mesoamerica, Yaxchilan Lintel 24 (right), shows Lady Xoc drawing a barbed rope through her tongue. In front of her, her husband and the ruler of Yaxchilan, Shield Jaguar, is shown holding a torch.

== Ideological undertones ==
Among all the Mesoamerican cultures, sacrifice, in whatever form, was a deeply symbolic and highly ritualized activity with strong religious and political significance. Various kinds of sacrifice were performed within a range of sociocultural contexts and in association with a variety of activities, from mundane everyday activities to those performed by the elites and ruling lineages with the aim of maintaining social structure. The social structure was maintained by showing that rulers blood sacrifice to the gods showed the power they had.

At its core, sacrifice symbolized the renewal of divine energy and, in doing so, the continuation of life. Its ability of bloodletting to do this is based on two intertwined concepts that are prevalent in the Maya belief system. The first is the notion that the gods had given life to humankind by sacrificing parts of their own bodies. The second is the central focus of their mythology on human blood, which signified life among the Maya. Within their belief system, human blood was partially made up of the blood of the gods, who sacrificed their own divine blood in creating life in humans. Thus, in order to continually maintain the order of their universe, the Maya believed that blood had to be given back to the gods. The rulers are giving their blood to empower the gods in return for giving them life.

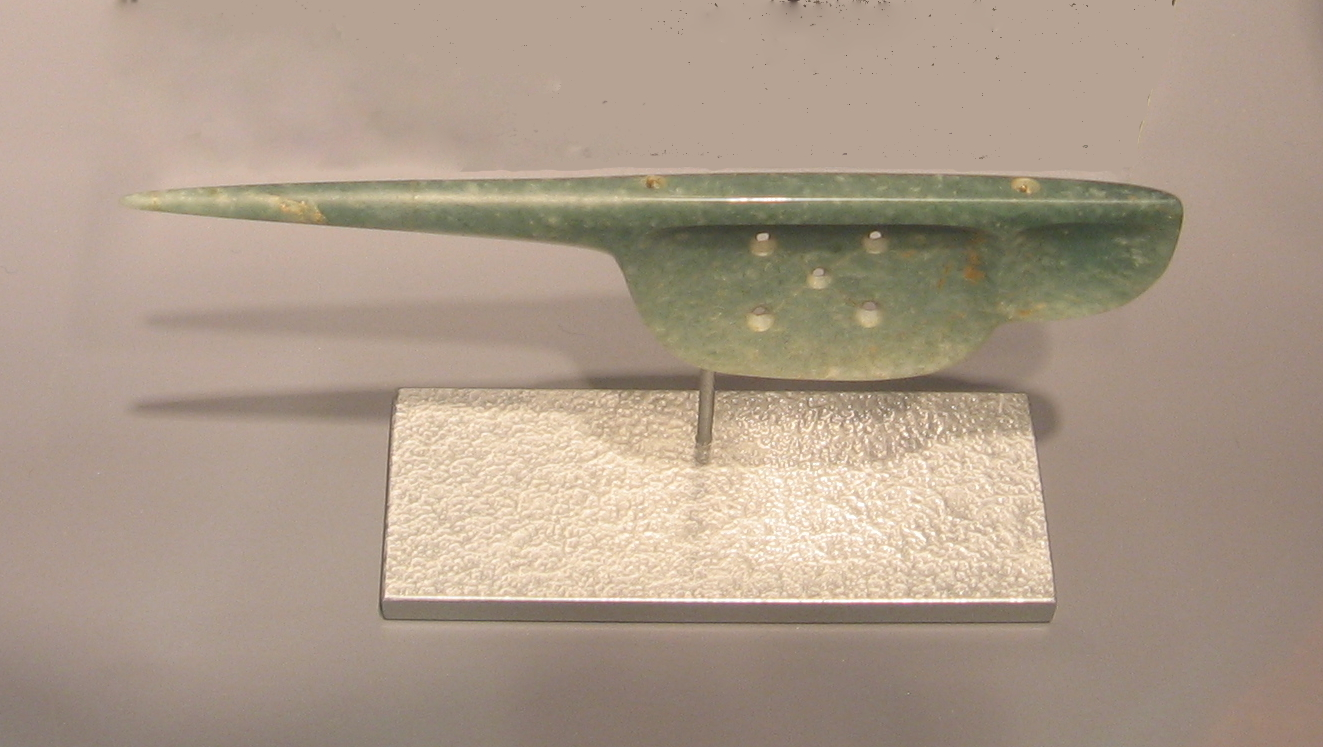
Olmec-style jadeite "spoon", believed to be a perforator, from Guerrero. 1500-300 BC

== Depictions of bloodletting in Mesoamerican cultures ==
Unlike later cultures, there is no representation of actual bloodletting in Olmec art. However, solid evidence for its practice exists in the jade and ceramic replicas of stingray spines and shark teeth as well as representations of such paraphernalia on monuments and stelae and in iconography.

A proposed translation of the Epi-Olmec culture's La Mojarra Stela 1, dated to roughly AD 155, tells of the ruler's ritual bloodletting by piercing his penis and his buttocks, as well as what appears to be a ritual sacrifice of the ruler's brother-in-law.

Bloodletting permeated Maya life. Kings performed bloodletting at every major political event. Building dedications, burials, marriages, and births all required bloodletting. As demonstrated by Yaxchilan Lintels 24 and 25, and duplicated in Lintels 17 and 15, bloodletting in Maya culture was also a means to a vision quest, where fasting, loss of blood, and perhaps hallucinogenics lead to visions of ancestors or gods.

Contemporaneous with the Maya, the south-central panel at the Classic era South Ballcourt at El Tajín shows the rain god piercing his penis, the blood from which flows into and replenishes a vat of the alcoholic ritual drink pulque.

== Early European reactions ==
Following the Spanish conquest of the Aztecs in 1521, many Spanish missionary-ethnographers arrived and recorded graphic and often unsympathetic descriptions of these rituals among both the Mayan and Nahuatl speaking peoples. Although most Spaniards understood the religious significance of the rites, they believed such idolatry merely confirmed the need for rapid conversion to Christianity. Many also confused genital bloodletting with circumcision, not least because they believed Indians were descendants of the lost tribes of Israel. One of the first to recognise the distinction was Diego de Landa in a 1566 manuscript:

"At times they sacrificed their own blood, cutting all around the ears in strips which they let hang as a sign. At other times they perforated their cheeks or the lower lip; again they made cuts in parts of the body, or pierced the tongue crossways and passed stalks through, causing extreme pain; again they hewed at the superfluous part of the penis, leaving the flesh in the form of two floppy ears. It was this custom which misled [engaño] the historian-general of the Indies to say that they practised circumcision." (original translation)

Nonetheless, the misconception that the Aztec and Maya people practised circumcision persists to this day.

== See also ==
- Human sacrifice in Maya culture
- Sacrifice in Maya culture
