= Baktun =

Unit of time in the ancient Maya Long Count Calendar

Baktun glyph

A baktun /ˈbɑːktuːn/ (properly bʼakʼtun [ɓakʼtun]) is 20 kʼatun cycles of the ancient Maya Long Count Calendar. It contains 144,000 days, equal to 394.26 tropical years. The Classic period of Maya civilization occurred during the 8th and 9th baktuns of the current calendrical cycle. The current baktun started on 13.0.0.0.0 – December 21, 2012 using the GMT correlation.

Archaeologist J. Eric S. Thompson stated that it is erroneous to say that a Long Count date of, for example, 9.15.10.0.0 is in the “9th baktun”, analogous to describing the year 209 AD as in the “2nd century AD”. Even so, the practice is so well established among Maya epigraphers and other students of the Maya, that to change it would cause more harm than its perpetuation. The current practice of referring to the current baktun as ”baktun 13” or “thirteenth baktun” may stand, even though it is properly the fourteenth baktun. Alternatively, the first baktun could instead be referred to as the 0th or null to avoid this ambiguity.

== Note ==
Today, 15:11, Saturday, June 20, 2026 (UTC), in the Long Count is 13.0.13.12.9 (based on the GMT correlation).

== See also ==
- Piktuns and higher orders
