= Buccal mask =

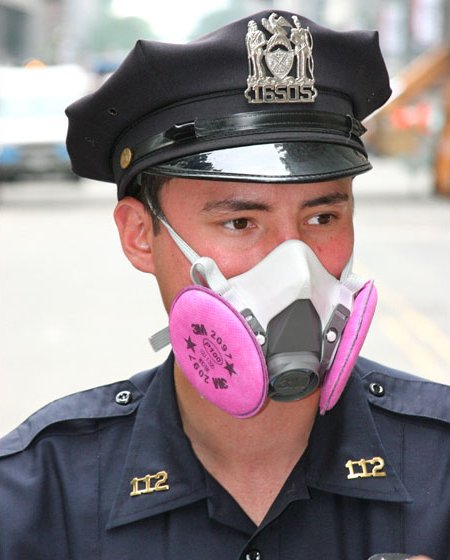
A New York City police officer wearing a naso-buccal mask, in this case for protection

A buccal mask is a mask covering the buccal area and mouth. Often the mask will also cover the nose, in which case it may also be referred to as a naso-buccal mask. In some cases it is used in medical settings, i.e. for non-invasive mechanical ventilation.

Buccal masks were a common feature in some ancient Mesoamerican cultures and are portrayed on Aztec, Zapotec, and Epi-Olmec culture artwork.
