= Semasiography =

Symbols with meaning but no corresponding spoken representation

Semasiography ('writing with signs', from Greek semasia 'signification' + graphia 'writing') is the use of symbols, called semasiographs, to "communicate information without the necessary intercession of forms of speech". This non-phonetic based technique is studied in semasiology within the field of linguistics.

Semasiography predates the advent of language-based writing. Contemporary systems like musical and mathematical notation, computer icons, and emoji have also been characterized as semasiographies.

== See also ==
- Blissymbols
