= Tres Zapotes =

Archeological site

Coordinates: 18°28′N 95°26′W

The Olmec heartland.

Tres Zapotes is a Mesoamerican archaeological site located in the south-central Gulf Lowlands of Mexico in the Papaloapan River plain. Tres Zapotes is sometimes referred to as the third major Olmec capital (after San Lorenzo Tenochtitlán and La Venta), but the Olmec phase is only a portion of the site's history, which continued through the Epi-Olmec and Classic Veracruz cultural periods.

The 2000-year existence of Tres Zapotes as a cultural center is unusual, if not unique, in Mesoamerica.

== Location ==
The site is located just north of the present-day village of Tres Zapotes, west of Santiago Tuxtla, Veracruz at the western edge of the Los Tuxtlas Mountains on the banks of the Rio Hueyapan (a small stream). The area is a transition point between the Los Tuxtlas Mountains and the Papaloapan River delta and allowed the inhabitants to take advantage of the forested uplands as well as the swamps and streams of the flatlands. Scarcely 10 km (6 mi) to the east stands Cerro el Vigía, an extinct volcano and important source of basalt and other volcanic stone, sandstone, and clay. The nearby small site of Rancho la Cobata, on the northern flank of Cerro El Vigía, may have functioned as a monument workshop – most of the basalt stonework at Tres Zapotes was crafted from the colossal, "spheroid", smooth-faced boulders found even today at the summit of Cerro El Vigía. Some of these boulders are more than 3 meters in diameter.

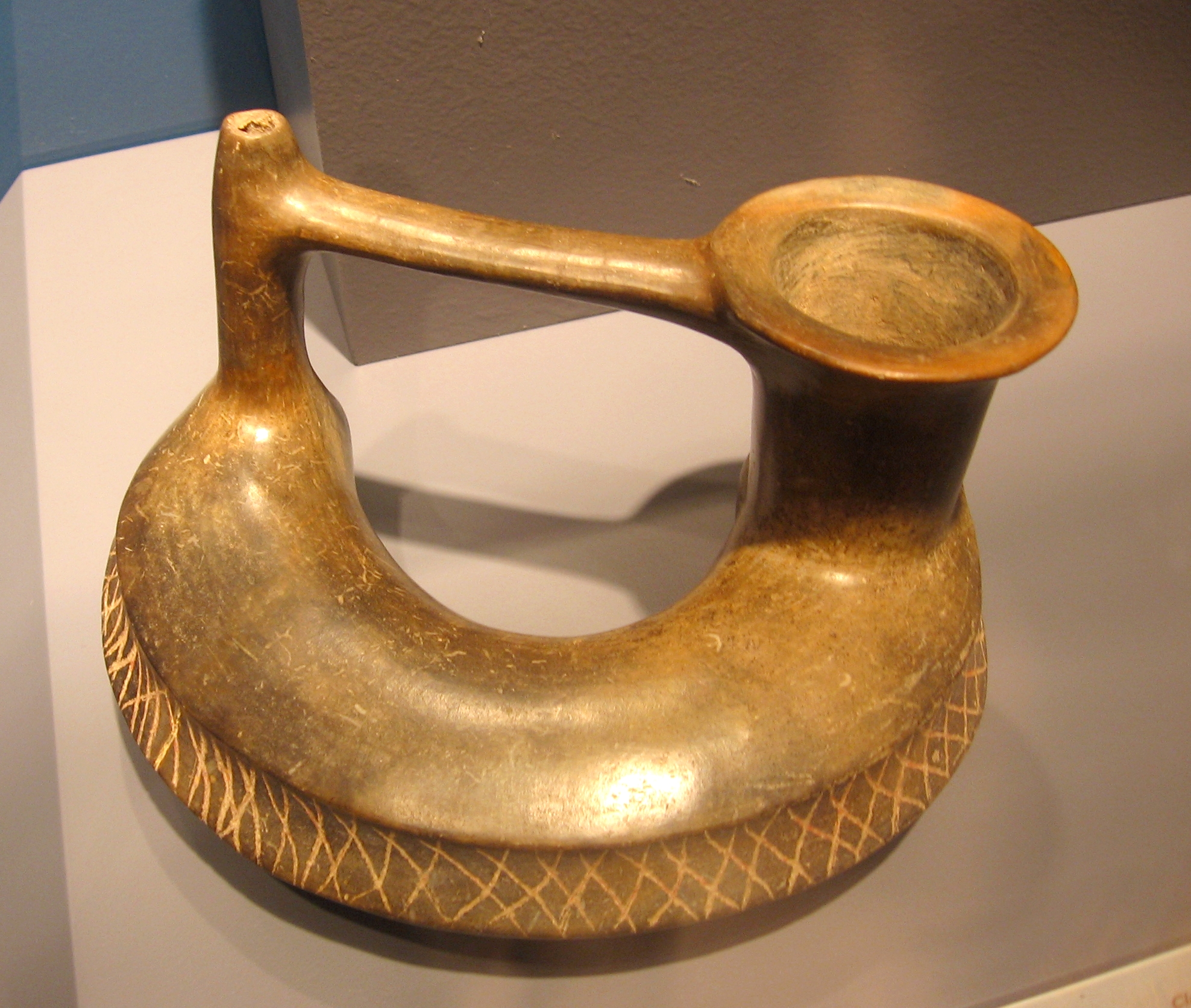
A vessel from Tres Zapotes' Epi-Olmec period, 300 BCE to 250 CE.

== History ==
=== Olmec ===
Founded some time in the centuries before 1000 BCE, Tres Zapotes emerged as a regional center early in the Middle Formative period, perhaps 900 - 800 BCE, roughly coinciding with the decline of San Lorenzo Tenochtitlan. The earliest public architecture yet detected has been dated to the end of the Middle Formative, perhaps 500 BCE.

It is thought that the two colossal heads date from this period. It was near Tres Zapotes that the first colossal head was discovered in 1862 by José Melgar. To date, two have been found locally, labeled "Monument A" and “Monument Q". Smaller than the colossal heads at San Lorenzo, they measure slightly less than 1.5 m (4 ft 11 in) high. Together with the cruder and significantly larger head at Rancho la Cobata, these colossal heads show evidence of a local style of dress and sculpture, differing from that of San Lorenzo and La Venta.

And, unlike the Olmec site of La Venta, Tres Zapotes was not abandoned at the close of the Middle Formative period, c. 400 BCE, nor was it immediately affected by the folding of the Olmec culture in the eastern Olmec heartland. However, during the next several hundred years, the Olmec culture at Tres Zapotes and on the western edge of the Olmec heartland would be gradually transformed into what has come to be called the Epi-Olmec (or post-Olmec) culture.

=== Epi-Olmec ===
Most of the monumental sculpture at Tres Zapotes is epi-Olmec, dating from the Late Formative period. These sculptures show, as do Tres Zapotes ceramics, a continuity with and yet a gradual change away from Olmec patterns. Tres Zapotes Stela D depicts a scene that is framed by the mouth of a monster, similar to the framing of La Venta's much more ancient Altar 4 — but while the Olmec altar refers to a mythical event, Stela D's content is historical in nature.

This framing device can also be seen Izapa Stela 2 which was carved at much the same time as Stela D. This and other similarities have led some archaeologists to suggest that Izapa heavily influenced Tres Zapotes' Epi-Olmec artistic conventions, or even that Tres Zapotes Epi-Olmec styles developed from the Izapan style. However, recent scholarship instead highlights "their descent from a common ancestor, the Olmec culture, with some sharing of motifs and techniques in an evolving co-tradition".

Despite similarities with earlier Olmec sculptures, though, Tres Zapotes Epi-Olmec sculpture appears to lack the artisanship, refinement, and detail of its San Lorenzo and La Venta predecessors. This is only partially attributable to the coarser local Cerro El Vigía basalt.

It was during this Epi-Olmec period that a new Mesoamerican writing system appeared at Tres Zapotes: the Isthmian (or Epi-Olmec) script, as well as some of the earliest dates in the Long Count calendar format.

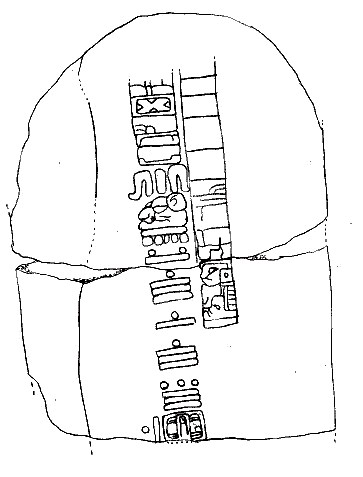
The back of Stela C The bars and circles show the Mesoamerican Long Count date of 7.16.6.16.18. The glyphs surrounding the date are one of the few surviving examples of Epi-Olmec script.

=== Classic era ===
Although the Classic era, starting roughly 300 CE, saw continued mound construction and Tres Zapotes remained a regional center, the era nonetheless brought a perceptible decline in Tres Zapotes' fortunes, as the centers of the new Classic Veracruz culture grew in prominence and size.

Tres Zapotes may have been abandoned by 900 CE, although there was a smaller and later occupation.

== Stela C ==
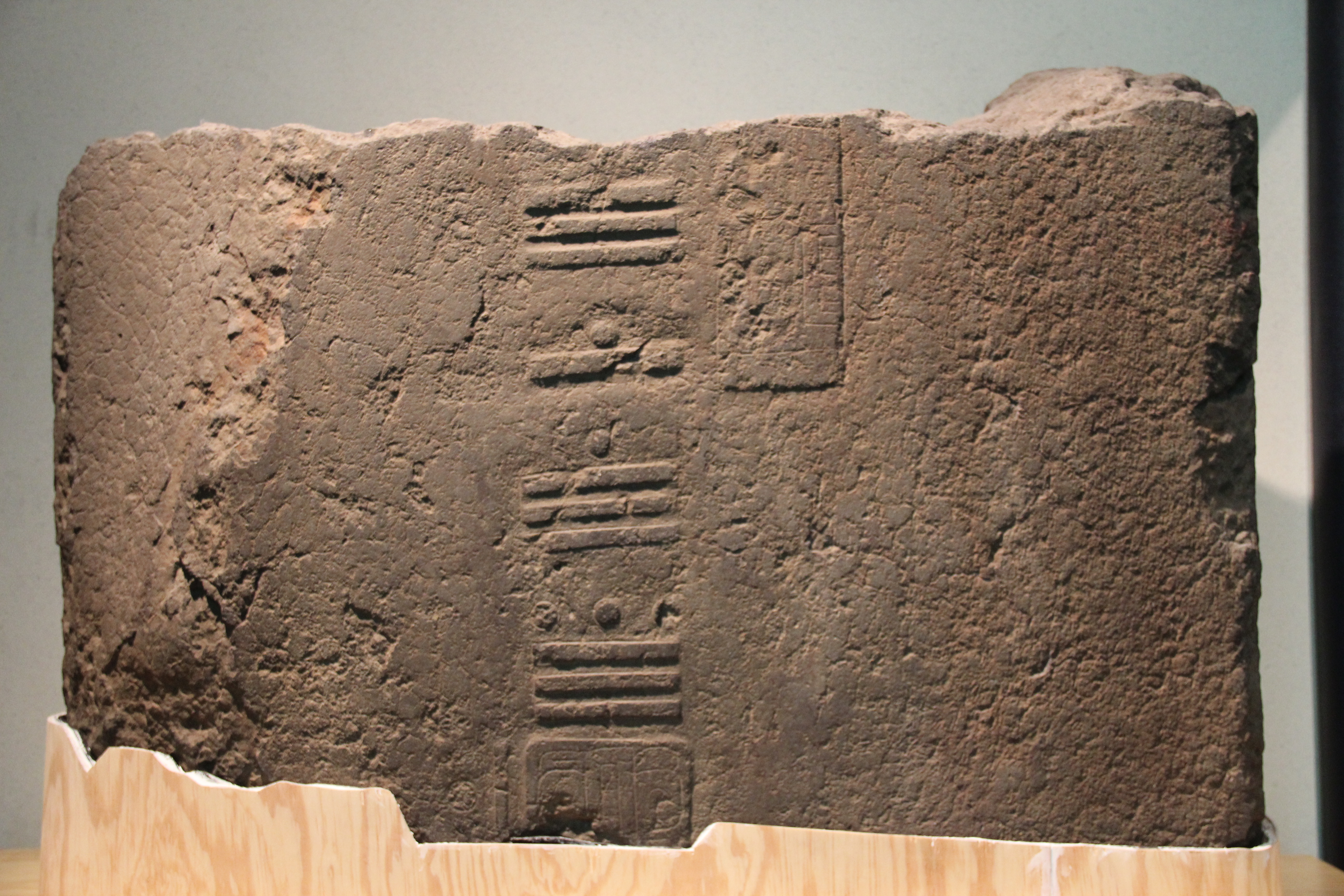
Stela C

In 1939, archaeologist Matthew Stirling discovered at Tres Zapotes the bottom half of Stela C. This stela was carved from basalt, with one side showing an Olmec-style engraving that has been variously characterized as an abstract were-jaguar or a ruler on a throne. On other side was the oldest Mesoamerican Long Count calendar date yet unearthed. This date, 7.16.6.16.18, correlates in the Gregorian calendar to September 3, 32 BCE, although there was some controversy over the missing baktun, the first digit, which Marion Stirling, Matthew's wife, had contended was a '7'. Her judgment was validated in 1969 when the top half of the stela was found.

Since 1939, only one older long-count date has been discovered, Stela 2 from Chiapa de Corzo, Chiapas, with a date of 7.16.3.2.13 (36 BCE).

The back of Stela C is engraved with one of the few surviving examples of Epi-Olmec script. A 1965 study concluded that Stela C, unlike most other basalt stonework at Tres Zapotes, was similar to the basalt used for La Venta Stela 3 and the basalt columns surrounding La Venta Complex A, which themselves have been traced to Punta Roca Partida, on the Gulf Coast at the northern side of the Los Tuxtlas Mountains.

The Epi-Olmec period site plan of Tres Zapotes, highlighting the four mound groups

== Site layout and societal organization ==
Over 160 mounds, platforms, and similar structures have been identified at Tres Zapotes, most of these being low residential platforms. The major Epi-Olmec period structures are the prosaically-named Groups 1, 2, and 3, and the similarly structured Nestepe Group (also known as Group 4). Group 2 is more or less in the center of the residential core with the other three spaced almost 1 km (1 mi) away from Group 2 and from each other.

This equidistant spacing likely reflects a decentralized political structure, each mound group the creation of a separate faction within Tres Zapotes society. This is in contrast to La Venta, for example, where the heavily centralized public architecture reflected a centralized rulership. At La Venta three of the four colossal heads were grouped together at the entrance to the ceremonial precinct while the fourth was at the edge of the large central plaza. The two Tres Zapotes heads were not in the central Group 2, but rather Monument A was located in Group 1 and Monument Q in the Nestepe Group.

Tres Zapotes's four mound groups are similar in design to those of Cerro de las Mesas, featuring a large plaza surrounded by several mounds, including a pyramidal or conical mound on the west end and a long mound on the north. The longer mounds likely supported administrative buildings and/or elite residences. The smaller mounds featured the residences of the lesser elites and temples.

Although similar in composition, the mound groups varied widely in scale and complexity. The relatively simple Nestepe group's mounds were under 3 m (10 ft) tall and the plaza covered about 1½ hectares (3½ acres). On the other hand, Groups 2 and 3 featured mounds up to 12 m (39 ft) high with plazas covering 4 hectares. It is expected that this variation reflected differences in the various factions' access to labor and the duration of their period of influence.

== Tres Zapotes museum ==
There is a museum in the village of Tres Zapotes so that tourists and scholars alike can view the Olmec heads as well as half of the Stela C (the other half being in Mexico City).
