= Isthmian script =

Mesoamerican set of symbols

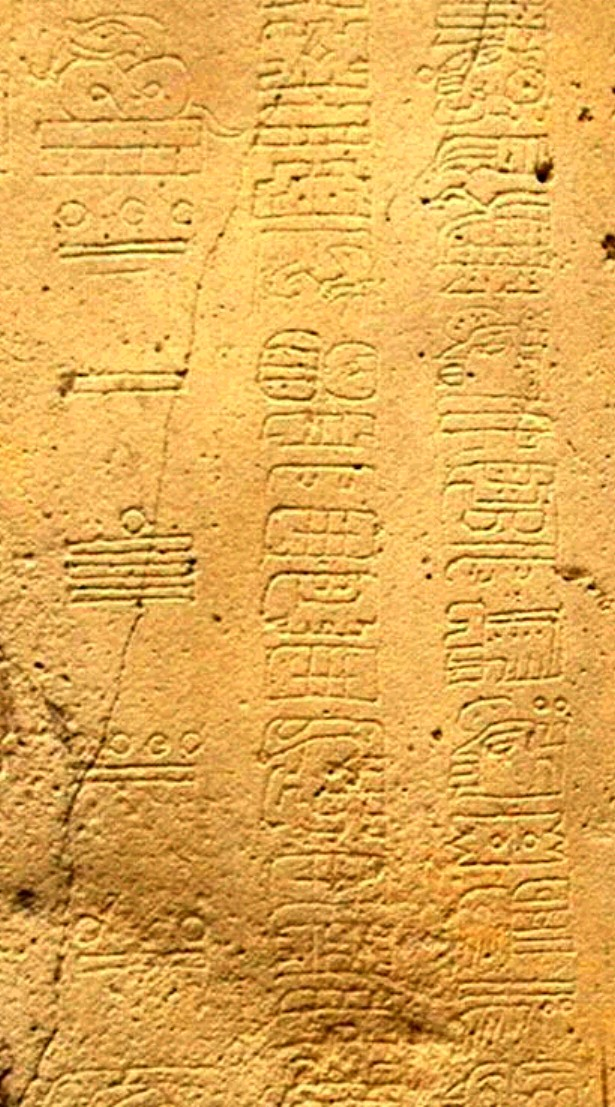
- Detail showing three columns of glyphs from La Mojarra Stela 1. The two right columns are Isthmian glyphs. The left column gives a Mesoamerican Long Count calendar date of 8.5.16.9.7, or 156 CE.
- Script type: Undeciphered (assumed to be logosyllabic)
- Period: c. 500 BCE – 500 CE
- Direction: Vertical writing
- Languages: Epi-Olmec (ISO639-3:xep)

Related scripts
- Parent systems: Olmec hieroglyphs (proto-writing)?: Isthmian script
- Child systems: Maya script?; Zapotec script?
- Sister systems: Maya script?; Zapotec script?

The Isthmian script is an early set of symbols found in inscriptions around the Isthmus of Tehuantepec, dating to c. 500 BCE – 500 CE, though with dates subject to disagreement. It is also called the La Mojarra script and the Epi-Olmec script ('post-Olmec script').

It has not been conclusively determined whether Isthmian script is a true writing system that represents a spoken language, or is a system of proto-writing. According to a disputed partial decipherment, it is structurally similar to the Maya script (an undisputed writing script), and like Maya uses one set of characters to represent morphemes, and a second set to represent syllables.

== Recovered texts ==
The four most extensive Isthmian texts are those found on:

- The La Mojarra Stela 1
- The Tuxtla Statuette
- Tres Zapotes Stela C
- A Teotihuacan-style mask

Other texts include:

- A few Isthmian glyphs on four badly weathered stelae — 5, 6, 8, and probably 15 — at Cerro de las Mesas.
- Approximately 23 glyphs on the O'Boyle "mask", a clay artifact of unknown provenance.
- A small number of glyphs on a pottery-sherd from Chiapa de Corzo. This sherd has been assigned the oldest date of any Isthmian script artifact: 450–300 BCE.

== Decipherment ==
Epi-Olmec
- (controversial)
- Native to: Mexico
- Region: La Mojarra
- Era: c. 500 BCE – 500 CE
- Language family: Mixe–Zoque? Mayan?: Epi-Olmec
- Writing system: Isthmian script

Language codes
- ISO 639-3: xep
- Glottolog: None

In a 1993 paper, John Justeson and Terrence Kaufman proposed a partial decipherment of the Isthmian text found on the La Mojarra Stela, claiming that the language represented was a member of the Zoquean language family. In 1997, the same two epigraphers published a second paper on Epi-Olmec writing, in which they further claimed that a newly discovered text-section from the stela had yielded readily to the decipherment-system that they had established earlier for the longer section of text. This led to a Guggenheim Fellowship for their work, in 2003.

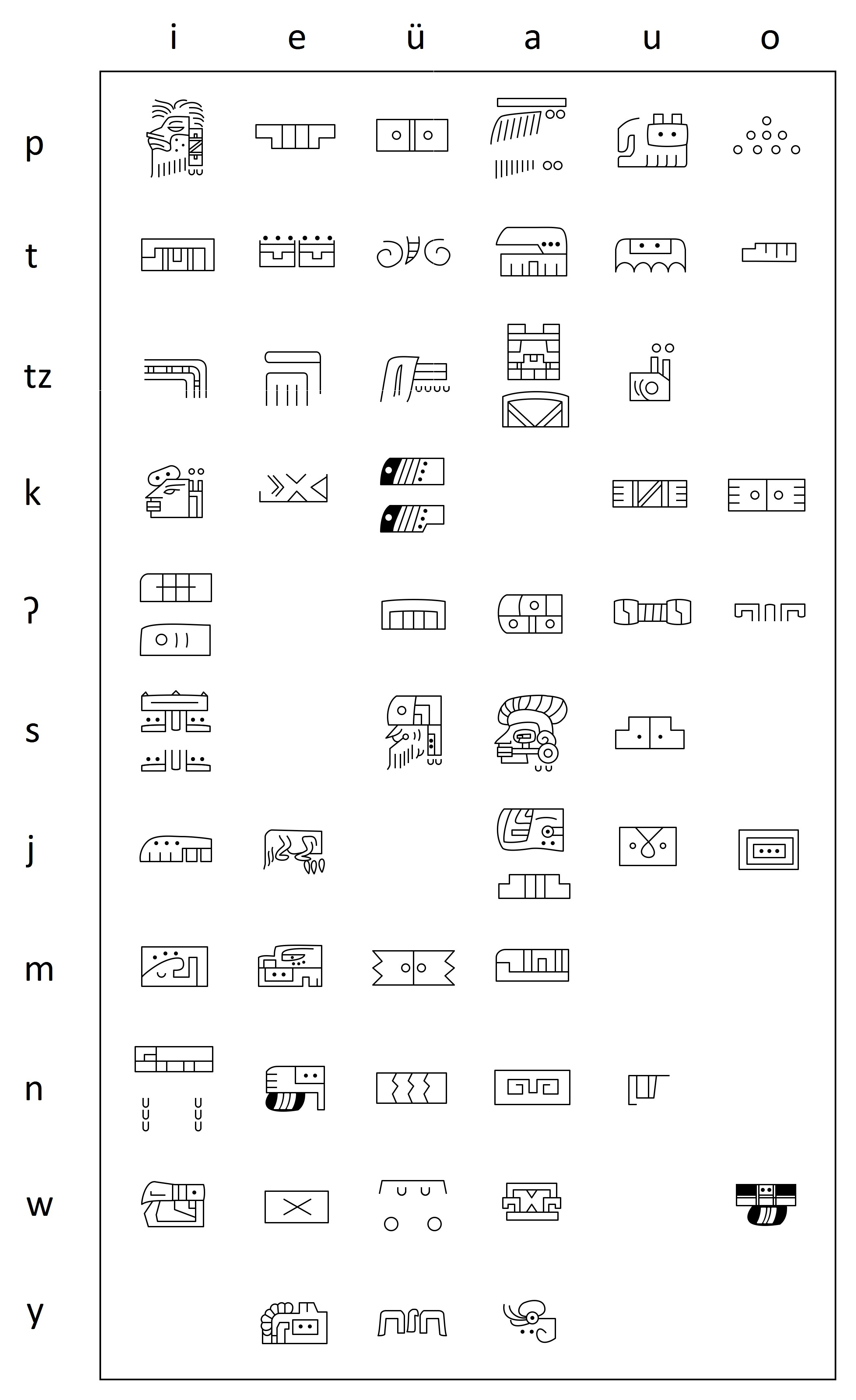
Epiolmec syllabary in the International Phonetic Alphabet according to Kaufman and Justeson 1996

The following year, however, their interpretation of the La Mojarra text was disputed by Stephen D. Houston and Michael D. Coe, who had tried unsuccessfully to apply the Justeson-Kaufman decipherment-system to the Isthmian text on the back of the hitherto unknown Teotihuacan-style mask (which is of unknown provenance and is now in a private collection).

Along with proposing an alternative linguistic attribution of Epi-Olmec writing as proto-Huastecan, Vonk (2020) argued that the size of the corpus compares unfavorably in comparison with the rate of repetition within the corpus, so that a unique decipherment is simply impossible given the current state of affairs. He goes on in illustrating the principal applicability of readings in random Old and New World languages (including Ancient Greek, Latin, Spanish and German) to demonstrate the coincidental nature of any such proposals.

The matter is still under discussion. In Lost Languages (2008) Andrew Robinson summarises the position as follows:

Overall, then, the case for the Justeson/Kaufman 'decipherment' of Isthmian is decidedly unproven and currently rests on shaky foundations ... What it needs, more urgently than some other 'decipherments' given its evident linguistic sophistication, is the discovery of a new text or texts as substantial as the one found at La Mojarra in 1986.

== See also ==
- Cascajal block
- San Andrés (Mesoamerican site)
- Epi-Olmec culture
- Olmec hieroglyphs
