= Mesoamerican Long Count calendar =

Calendar used by Mesoamerican cultures

Today (at UTC+00)
- Sunday, 4 October 2026
- Maya: 13.0.13.17.15; 8 Yax, 8 Men
Other calendars
Akan	Nkyikwasi
Armenian	16 Sahmi 1476
Aztec	Izcalli 2, 8 Cuāuhtli
Babylonian	21 Ululu, 2337 SE
Balinese pawukon	Luang, Pepet, Kajeng, Sri, Wage, Urukung, Redite of Wayang, Ludra, Dadi, Raksasa
Bengali	19 Ashshin, BS 1433
Chinese	Yin Metal Pig・Hairy Head Mansion; Fire Horse Year, Month 8, Day 24 (Qiufen, 4 days until Hanlu)
Common Era	4 October 2026 CE
Coptic	24 Thout, AM 1743
Egyptian	21 Mechir, 2775 NE
Ethiopian	24 Maskaram, 2019 Amätä Məhrät
French Republican	Décade II, Duodi de Vendémiaire de l'Année 235 de la République
Gregorian	4 October, AD 2026
Hebrew	23 Tishrei, AM 5787
Hindu	Punarvasu・Parigha; Solar: 18 Āśvina, 1948 SE; Lunisolar: Aṣṭamī, Kṛishna pakṣa of Bhādrapada, 2083 VE; Rāudra・5127 KY・1,872,852
Icelandic	Sunnudagur, 11 Haustmánuður 2026
Islamic	21 Rabi' al-thani, AH 1448 (using tabular method)
ISO week date	2026-W40-7
Japanese	24 Hazuki, Reiwa 8 (Shūbun, 4 days until Kanro)
Julian	21 September, AD 2026 (AM 7534)
Julian day	2461318
Korean	24 Dakdal, 4359 DE
Roman	ante diem XI Kalendas Octobres, MMDCCLXXIX AUC
Solar Hijri	12 Mehr, SH 1405
Tibetan	23 khrums, me pho rta 2153 or 1772 or 1000

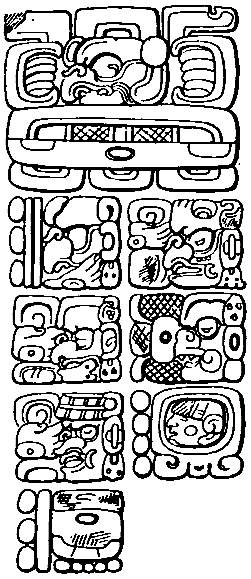
East side of stela C, Quirigua with the mythical creation date of 13 baktuns, 0 katuns, 0 tuns, 0 winals, 0 kins, 4 Ahau 8 Cumku – August 11, 3114 BCE in the proleptic Gregorian calendar.

The Mesoamerican Long Count calendar is a non-repeating base-20 and base-18 calendar used by pre-Columbian Mesoamerican cultures, most notably the Maya. For this reason, it is often known as the Maya Long Count calendar. Using a modified vigesimal tally, the Long Count calendar identifies a day by counting the number of days passed since a mythical creation date that corresponds to August 11, 3114 BCE in the proleptic Gregorian calendar. (Note: The correlation between the Long Count and Western calendars is calculated according to the one used by a majority of Maya researchers, known as the (modified) GMT or Goodman-Martinez-Thompson correlation. An alternate correlation sometimes used puts the starting date two days later. August 11, 3114 BCE is a date in the proleptic Gregorian calendar, which is to September 6, −3113 Julian astronomical.) The Long Count calendar was widely used on monuments.

== Background ==
The two most widely used calendars in pre-Columbian Mesoamerica were the 260-day tzolkʼin and the 365-day haabʼ. The equivalent Aztec calendars are known in Nahuatl as the tōnalpōhualli and xiuhpōhualli, respectively.

The combination of a haabʼ and a tzolkʼin date identifies a day in a combination which does not occur again for 18,980 days (52 haabʼ cycles of 365 days equals 73 tzolkʼin cycles of 260 days, approximately 52 years), a period known as the Calendar Round. To identify days over periods longer than this, Mesoamericans used the Long Count calendar.

== Long Count periods ==
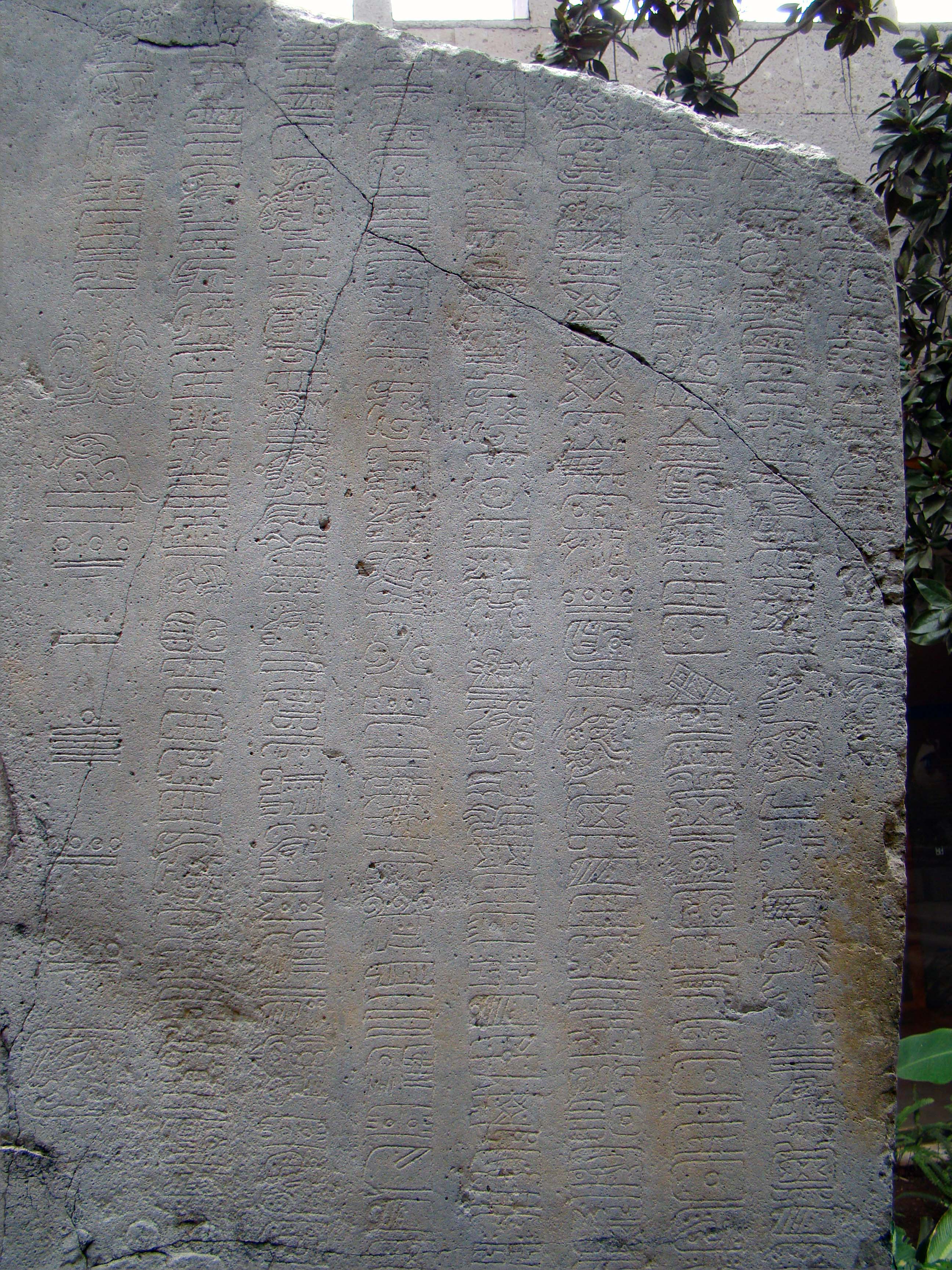
Detail showing columns of glyphs from a portion of the 2nd century CE La Mojarra Stela 1. The left column gives a Long Count date of 8.5.16.9.7, or 156 CE. The other columns visible are glyphs from the Epi-Olmec script.

The Long Count calendar identifies a date by counting the number of days from a starting date that is generally calculated to be August 11, 3114 BCE in the proleptic Gregorian calendar or September 6 in the Julian calendar (or −3113 in astronomical year numbering). There has been much debate over the precise correlation between the Western calendars and the Long Count calendars. The August 11 date is based on the GMT correlation.

The completion of 13 bʼakʼtuns (August 11, 3114 BCE) marks the Creation of the world of human beings according to the Maya. On this day, Raised-up-Sky-Lord caused three stones to be set by associated gods at Lying-Down-Sky, First-Three-Stone-Place. Because the sky still lay on the primordial sea, it was black. The setting of the three stones centered the cosmos which allowed the sky to be raised, revealing the Sun.

Rather than using a base 10 scheme, the Long Count days were tallied in a modified base-20 scheme. In a pure base 20 scheme, 0.0.0.1.5 is equal to 25 and 0.0.0.2.0 is equal to 40. The Long Count is not pure base-20, however, since the second digit from the right (and only that digit) rolls over to zero when it reaches 18. Thus 0.0.1.0.0 does not represent 400 days, but rather only 360 days and 0.0.0.17.19 represents 359 days.

The name bʼakʼtun was invented by modern scholars. The numbered Long Count was no longer in use by the time the Spanish arrived in the Yucatán Peninsula, although unnumbered kʼatuns and tuns were still in use. Instead the Maya were using an abbreviated Short Count.

Table of Long Count units
Long Count unit	Long Count period	Days	Approximate Solar Years
1 Kʼin		1	
1 Winal	20 Kʼin	20	
1 Tun	18 Winal	360	1
1 Kʼatun	20 Tun	7,200	20
1 Bʼakʼtun	20 Kʼatun	144,000	394
1 Piktun	20 Bʼakʼtun	2,880,000	7,885
1 Kalabtun	20 Piktun	57,600,000	157,704
1 Kʼinchiltun	20 Kalabtun	1,152,000,000	3,154,071
1 Alautun	20 Kʼinchiltun	23,040,000,000	63,081,429
1 Hablatun	20 Alautun	460,800,000,000	1,261,628,585

== Mesoamerican numerals ==
Maya numerals

Long Count dates are written with Mesoamerican numerals, as shown on this table. A dot represents 1 while a bar equals 5. The shell glyph was used to represent the zero concept. The Long Count calendar required the use of zero as a place-holder and presents one of the earliest uses of the zero concept in history.

On Maya monuments, the Long Count syntax is more complex. The date sequence is given once, at the beginning of the inscription and opens with the so-called ISIG (Introductory Series Initial Glyph) which reads tzik-a(h) habʼ [patron of Haabʼ month] ("revered was the year-count with the patron [of the month]"). Next come the 5 digits of the Long Count, followed by the Calendar Round (tzolkʼin and Haabʼ) and supplementary series. The supplementary series is optional and contains lunar data, for example, the age of the Moon on the day and the calculated length of current lunation. (Note: Notable in this sequence is the glyph with nine variant forms labeled G by early epigraphers. It has been connected with the cycle of Lords of the Night known from colonial era sources in Central Mexico but alternate explanations have also been offered. See Thompson.) The text then continues with whatever activity occurred on that date.

A drawing of a full Maya Long Count inscription is shown below.

== Earliest Long Counts ==
The earliest contemporaneous Long Count inscription yet discovered is on Stela 2 at Chiapa de Corzo, Chiapas, Mexico, showing a date of 36 BCE (although this date is not certain, see table), although Stela 2 from Takalik Abaj, Guatemala might be earlier. (See illustration.) Takalik Abaj Stela 2's highly battered Long Count inscription shows 7 bak'tuns, followed by k'atuns with a tentative 6 coefficient, but that could also be 11 or 16, giving the range of possible dates to fall between 236 and 19 BCE. (Note: To clarify, there are Long Count inscriptions which refer to dates earlier than the 1st century BCE, but these were carved much later in a retrospective fashion.)

Although Takalik Abaj Stela 2 remains controversial, this table includes it, as well as six other artifacts with the eight oldest Long Count inscriptions according to Dartmouth professor Vincent H. Malmström (two of the artifacts contain two dates and Malmström does not include Takalik Abaj Stela 2). Interpretations of inscriptions on some artifacts differ.

Archaeological site	Name	Gregorian date GMT (584283) correlation	Long Count	Location
Takalik Abaj	Stela 2	236 – 19 BCE	7.(6,11,16).?.?.?	Retalhuleu, Guatemala
Chiapa de Corzo	Stela 2	December 6, 36 BCE or October 9, 182 CE	7.16.3.2.13 or 8.7.3.2.13	Chiapas, Mexico
Tres Zapotes	Stela C	September 1, 32 BCE	7.16.6.16.18	Veracruz, Mexico
El Baúl	Stela 1	11 – 37 CE	7.18.9.7.12, 7.18.14.8.12, 7.19.7.8.12, or 7.19.15.7.12	Escuintla, Guatemala
Takalik Abaj	Stela 5	August 31, 83 CE or May 19, 103 CE	8.2.2.10.15 or 8.3.2.10.15	Retalhuleu, Guatemala
Takalik Abaj	Stela 5	June 3, 126 CE	8.4.5.17.11	Retalhuleu, Guatemala
La Mojarra	Stela 1	May 19, 143 CE	8.5.3.3.5	Veracruz, Mexico
La Mojarra	Stela 1	July 11, 156 CE	8.5.16.9.7	Veracruz, Mexico
Near La Mojarra	Tuxtla Statuette	March 12, 162 CE	8.6.2.4.17	Veracruz, Mexico

Of the six sites, three are on the western edge of the Maya homeland and three are several hundred kilometers further west, leading some researchers to believe that the Long Count calendar predates the Maya. La Mojarra Stela 1, the Tuxtla Statuette, Tres Zapotes Stela C and Chiapa Stela 2 are all inscribed in an Epi-Olmec, not Maya, style. El Baúl Stela 2, on the other hand, was created in the Izapan style.

The first unequivocally Maya artifact is Stela 29 from Tikal, with the Long Count date of 292 CE (8.12.14.8.15), more than 300 years after Stela 2 from Chiapa de Corzo.

More recently, with the discovery in Guatemala of the San Bartolo stone block text (c. 300 BCE), it has been argued that this text celebrates an upcoming time period ending celebration. This time period may have been projected to end sometime between 7.3.0.0.0 (295 BCE) and 7.5.0.0.0 (256 BCE). Besides being the earliest Maya hieroglyphic text so far uncovered, this would arguably be the earliest evidence to date of Long Count notation in Mesoamerica.

Recently at the site of El Palmar in Mexico three stelae (stelae 20, 45 and 46) were analyzed and said to hold the earliest long count date of a lowland Mayan site. The date of Stelae 46 was 8.7.1.0.0 4 Ajaw 8 Sotz (Aug. 31, AD 180 Julian). The stelae were examined combining photogrammetry and the Artec Spider II high-resolution 3D scanner.

== Latest Long Counts ==
The Xultun Stela 10 at the site of Xultun in Guatemala, excavations in 1915 found an inscription with a Long Count date of "10.3.0.0.0 1 Ajaw 3 Yaxk’in (ad 889)", at that time the latest. Monument inscriptions at Seibal and Uaxactun in Guatemala had the same date. For context, the latest known long count date from Palenque is "9.18.9.4.4, corresponding to A.D. November 15, 799" (November 11 Julian GMT), on pottery. Inscriptions from Toniná (on a jade stone) and Tzibanche in Mexico had a long count date of "10.4.0.0.0" (January 18, 909 AD - January 13 Julian GMT). The Dresden Codex has a long count date of 10.19.6.1.8" (September 25, 1210 AD - September 18 Julian GMT) though this may not be historical. Other similar late long count dates have been found in the Dresden Codex, such as "10.13.13 .3.2".

== Correlations between Western calendars and the Long Count ==
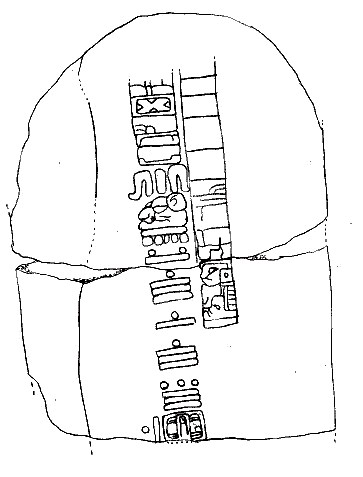
The back of Stela C from Tres Zapotes, an Olmec archaeological site. This is the second oldest Long Count date yet discovered. The numerals 7.16.6.16.18 translate to September 1, 32 BCE (Gregorian). The glyphs surrounding the date are what is thought to be one of the few surviving examples of Epi-Olmec script.

The Maya and Western calendars are correlated by using a Julian day number (JDN) of the starting date of the current creation — 13.0.0.0.0, 4 Ajaw, 8 Kumkʼu. (Note: All extant Maya inscriptions that represent this base date wrote it with a "13" bakʼtuns, not "0". But when using "13.0.0.0.0" as a base date in calculations, the "13" bakʼtuns has the numerical value 0, as if it were written as "0.0.0.0.0". This is easily confused when the "13" bakʼtuns has the actual value 13 in the current baktʼun, as in the Maya date for today: 13.0.13.17.15 (=03:47, Sunday, October 4, 2026 (UTC)).) This is referred to as a "correlation constant". The generally accepted correlation constant is the Modified Thompson 2, "Goodman–Martinez–Thompson", or GMT correlation of 584,283 days. Using the GMT correlation, the current creation started on September 6, −3113 (Julian astronomical) – August 11, 3114 BCE in the Proleptic Gregorian calendar. The study of correlating the Maya and western calendar is referred to as the correlation question. The GMT correlation is also called the 11.16 correlation.

In Breaking the Maya Code, Michael D. Coe writes: "In spite of oceans of ink that have been spilled on the subject, there now is not the slightest chance that these three scholars (conflated to G-M-T when talking about the correlation) were not right ..." The evidence for the GMT correlation is historical, astronomical and archaeological:

Historical: Calendar Round dates with a corresponding Julian date are recorded in Diego de Landa's Relación de las cosas de Yucatán (written circa 1566), the Chronicle of Oxcutzkab and the books of Chilam Balam. De Landa records a date that is a Tun ending in the Short Count. Oxkutzcab contains 12 Tun endings. Bricker and Bricker find that only the GMT correlation is consistent with these dates. The Book of Chilam Balam of Chumayel contains the only colonial reference to classic long-count dates. The Julian calendar date of 11.16.0.0.0 (November 2, 1539) confirms the GMT correlation.

The Annals of the Cakchiquels contains numerous Tzolkʼin dates correlated with European dates. These confirm the GMT correlation. Weeks, Sachse and Prager transcribed three divinatory calendars from highland Guatemala. They found that the 1772 calendar confirms the GMT correlation. The fall of the capital city of the Aztec Empire, Tenochtitlan, occurred on August 13, 1521. A number of different chroniclers wrote that the Tzolkʼin (Tonalpohualli) date of the event was 1 Snake.

Post-conquest scholars such as Sahagún and Durán recorded Tonalpohualli dates with a calendar date. Many indigenous communities in the Mexican states of Veracruz, Oaxaca and Chiapas and in Guatemala, principally those speaking the Mayan languages Ixil, Mam, Pokomchí and Quiché, keep the Tzolkʼin and in many cases the Haabʼ. These are all consistent with the GMT correlation. Munro Edmonsen studied 60 Mesoamerican calendars, 20 of which have known correlations to European calendars, and found remarkable consistency among them and that only the GMT correlation fits the historical, ethnographic and astronomical evidence.

Astronomical: Any correct correlation must match the astronomical content of classic inscriptions. The GMT correlation does an excellent job of matching lunar data in the supplementary series. For example: An inscription at the Temple of the Sun at Palenque records that on Long Count 9.16.4.10.8 there were 26 days completed in a 30-day lunation. This Long Count is also the entry date for the eclipse table of the Dresden Codex. (Note: According to Thompson "The point from which the moon age is counted is not surely known. The possibilities are disappearance of the old moon, conjunction, or appearance of the new moon ... Beyer (1973a) believed that the calculation was made from the disappearance of the old moon. The latter method of counting (disappearance of the old moon) is still current in some Tzeltal, Chol, and Tzotzil villages in Chiapas ...")

Using the third method, the Palenque system, the new moon would have been the first evening when one could look to the west after sunset and see the thin crescent moon. Given our modern ability to know exactly where to look, when the crescent Moon is favorably located, from an excellent site, on rare occasions, using binoculars or a telescope, observers can see and photograph the crescent moon less than one day after conjunction. Generally, most observers cannot see the new Moon with the naked eye until the first evening when the lunar phase day is at least 1.5. If one assumes that the new moon is the first day when the lunar phase day is at least 1.5 at six in the evening in time zone UTC−6 (the time zone of the Maya area), the GMT correlation will match many lunar inscriptions exactly. In this example the lunar phase day was 27.7 (26 days counting from zero) at 6 pm after a conjunction at 1:25 am October 10, 755 and a new Moon when the lunar phase day was 1.7 at 6 pm on October 11, 755 (Julian calendar). This works well for many but not all lunar inscriptions.

Modern astronomers refer to the conjunction of the Sun and Moon (the time when the Sun and Moon have the same ecliptic longitude) as the new moon. But Mesoamerican astronomy was observational, not theoretical. The people of Mesoamerica did not know about the Copernican nature of the Solar System — they had no theoretical understanding of the orbital nature of the heavenly bodies. Some authors analyze the lunar inscriptions based on this modern understanding of the motions of the Moon but there is no evidence that the Mesoamericans shared it.

The first method seems to have been used for other inscriptions such as Quirgua stela E (9.17.0.0.0). By the third method, that stela should show a moon age of 26 days, but in fact it records a new moon. Using the GMT correlation at six AM in the time zone UTC−6, this would be 2.25 days before conjunction, so it could record the first day when one could not see the waning moon.

Fuls analysed these inscriptions and found strong evidence for the Palenque system and the GMT correlation; however, he cautioned: "Analysis of the Lunar Series shows that at least two different methods and formulas were used to calculate the moon's age and position in the six-month cycle ..." which gives eclipse seasons when the Moon is near its ascending or descending node and an eclipse is likely to occur. Dates converted using the GMT correlation agree closely with the Dresden Codex eclipse tables. The Dresden Codex contains a Venus table which records the heliacal risings of Venus. Using the GMT correlation these agree closely with modern astronomical calculations.

Archaeological: Various items that can be associated with specific Long Count dates have been isotope dated. In 1959 the University of Pennsylvania carbon dated samples from ten wood lintels from Tikal. These were carved with a date equivalent to 741 AD, using the GMT correlation. The average carbon date was 746±34 years. Recently one of these, Lintel 3 from Temple I, was analyzed again using more accurate methods and found to agree closely with the GMT correlation. In 2012, using modern AMS radiocarbon dating, a single beam from Tikal was dated, also strongly supporting the GMT.

If a proposed correlation only has to agree with one of these lines of evidence there could be numerous other possibilities. Astronomers have proposed many correlations, for example: Lounsbury, Fuls, et al., Böhm and Böhm and Stock.

Today, 4 October 2026 (UTC), in the Long Count is 13.0.13.17.15 (using GMT correlation).

JDN correlations to the Maya creation date (after Thompson 1971, et al. and Aveni 1980)
Name	Correlation
Bowditch	394,483
Willson	438,906
Smiley	482,699
Makemson	489,138
Modified Spinden	489,383
Spinden	489,384
Teeple	492,622
Dinsmoor	497,879
−4CR	508,363
−2CR	546,323
Stock	556,408
Goodman	584,280
Martinez–Hernandez	584,281
GMT	584,283
Modified Thompson 1	584,284
Thompson (Lounsbury)	584,285
Pogo	588,626
+2CR	622,243
Böhm & Böhm	622,261
Kreichgauer	626,927
+4CR	660,203
Fuls, et al.	660,208
Hochleitner	674,265
Schultz	677,723
Escalona–Ramos	679,108
Vaillant	679,183
Weitzel	774,078

Long Count	(proleptic before 1582) Gregorian date GMT (584,283) correlation	Julian day number
0.0.0.0.0 (13.0.0.0.0)	Mon, Aug 11, 3114 BCE	584,283
1.0.0.0.0	Thu, Nov 13, 2720 BCE	728,283
2.0.0.0.0	Sun, Feb 16, 2325 BCE	872,283
3.0.0.0.0	Wed, May 21, 1931 BCE	1,016,283
4.0.0.0.0	Sat, Aug 23, 1537 BCE	1,160,283
5.0.0.0.0	Tue, Nov 26, 1143 BCE	1,304,283
6.0.0.0.0	Fri, Feb 28, 748 BCE	1,448,283
7.0.0.0.0	Mon, Jun 3, 354 BCE	1,592,283
8.0.0.0.0	Thu, Sep 5, 41 CE	1,736,283
9.0.0.0.0	Sun, Dec 9, 435	1,880,283
10.0.0.0.0	Wed, Mar 13, 830	2,024,283
11.0.0.0.0	Sat, Jun 15, 1224	2,168,283
12.0.0.0.0	Tue, Sep 18, 1618	2,312,283
13.0.0.0.0	Fri, Dec 21, 2012	2,456,283
14.0.0.0.0	Mon, Mar 26, 2407	2,600,283
15.0.0.0.0	Thu, Jun 28, 2801	2,744,283
16.0.0.0.0	Sun, Oct 1, 3195	2,888,283
17.0.0.0.0	Wed, Jan 3, 3590	3,032,283
18.0.0.0.0	Sat, Apr 7, 3984	3,176,283
19.0.0.0.0	Tue, Jul 11, 4378	3,320,283
1.0.0.0.0.0	Fri, Oct 13, 4772	3,464,283

== 2012 and the Long Count ==
According to the Popol Vuh, a book compiling details of creation accounts known to the Kʼicheʼ Maya of the Colonial-era highlands, humankind lives in the fourth world. The Popol Vuh describes the first three creations that the gods failed in making and the creation of the successful fourth world where men were placed. In the Maya Long Count, the previous creation ended at the end of a 13th bʼakʼtun.

The previous creation ended on a Long Count of 12.19.19.17.19. Another 12.19.19.17.19 occurred on December 20, 2012 (Gregorian Calendar), followed by the start of the 14th bʼakʼtun, 13.0.0.0.0, on December 21, 2012. (Note: Various sources place this on other dates, notably on December 23.) There are only two references to the current creation's 13th bʼakʼtun in the fragmentary Mayan corpus: Tortuguero Monument 6, part of a ruler's inscription and the recently discovered La Corona Hieroglyphic Stairway 2, Block V.

Maya inscriptions occasionally reference future predicted events or commemorations that would occur on dates that lie beyond 2012 (that is, beyond the completion of the 13th bʼakʼtun of the current era). Most of these are in the form of "distance dates" where some Long Count date is given, together with a Distance Number that is to be added to the Long Count date to arrive at this future date.

For example, on the west panel at the Temple of Inscriptions in Palenque, a section of the text projects into the future to the 80th Calendar Round (CR) 'anniversary' of the famous Palenque ruler Kʼinich Janaabʼ Pakal's accession to the throne (Pakal's accession occurred on a Calendar Round date 5 Lamat 1 Mol, at Long Count 9.9.2.4.8 equivalent to 27 July 615 CE in the proleptic Gregorian calendar). (Note: Gregorian, using GMT correlation JDN=584283.) It does this by commencing with Pakal's birthdate 9.8.9.13.0 8 Ajaw 13 Pop (24 March 603 CE Gregorian) and adding to it the Distance Number 10.11.10.5.8.

This calculation arrives at the 80th Calendar Round since his accession, a day that also has a CR date of 5 Lamat 1 Mol, but which lies over 4,000 years in the future from Pakal's time—the day 21 October in the year 4772. The inscription notes that this day would fall eight days after the completion of the 1st piktun (since the creation or zero date of the Long Count system), where the piktun is the next-highest order above the bʼakʼtun in the Long Count. If the completion date of that piktun—13 October 4772—were to be written out in Long Count notation, it could be represented as 1.0.0.0.0.0. The 80th CR anniversary date, eight days later, would be 1.0.0.0.0.8 5 Lamat 1 Mol.

Despite the publicity generated by the 2012 date, Susan Milbrath, curator of Latin American Art and Archaeology at the Florida Museum of Natural History, stated that "We have no record or knowledge that [the Maya] would think the world would come to an end" in 2012. USA Today writes "'For the ancient Maya, it was a huge celebration to make it to the end of a whole cycle,' says Sandra Noble, executive director of the Foundation for the Advancement of Mesoamerican Studies in Crystal River, Florida. To render December 21, 2012, as a doomsday event or moment of cosmic shifting, she says, is 'a complete fabrication and a chance for a lot of people to cash in.'" "There will be another cycle," says E. Wyllys Andrews V, director of the Tulane University Middle American Research Institute (MARI). "We know the Maya thought there was one before this, and that implies they were comfortable with the idea of another one after this."

== Converting between the Long Count and western calendars ==
=== Calculating a Western calendar date from a Long Count ===
It is important to know the difference between the Julian and Gregorian calendars when calculating a Western calendar date from a Long Count date. (Note: In 46 BC Julius Caesar adopted the convention of having three years of twelve months of approximately 30 days each to make a year of 365 days and a leap year of 366 days. This made the length of the civil year 365.25 days, close to the length of the solar year of 365.2422 days. This is the Julian calendar. By 1582 there was an appreciable discrepancy between the winter solstice and Christmas and the spring equinox and Easter. Pope Gregory XIII, with the help of Italian astronomer Aloysius Lilius (Luigi Lilio), reformed this system by abolishing the days October 5 through October 14, 1582. This brought the civil and tropical years closer together. He also missed three days every four centuries by decreeing that centuries are only leap years if they are evenly divisible by 400. So for example 1700, 1800 and 1900 are not leap years but 1600 and 2000 are. This is the Gregorian calendar. Astronomical calculations will return a year zero and years before that are negative numbers. This is astronomical dating. Years before 46 BC are calculated as proleptic Julian dates. There is no year zero in historical dating. In historical dating the year 1 BCE is followed by the year 1 CE For example, the year −3113 (astronomical dating) is the same as 3114 BCE (historical dating). Many books about the Maya and many computer programs to do Maya calendar conversions use the Proleptic Gregorian calendar. In this calendar all dates before the start of the Gregorian calendar are revised as if the Gregorian calendar had been in use before its adoption in October 1582. Although this system is popular among Mayanists, it is rarely used by anyone else, so for example, dates converted using this system are useless for the study of Maya Astronomy.)

Using as an example the Long Count date of 9.10.11.17.0 (Long Count date mentioned on the Palenque Palace Tablet), first calculate the number of days that have passed since the zero date (August 11, 3114 BCE; GMT correlation, in the Proleptic Gregorian calendar, September 6, −3113 Julian astronomical).

9	× 144,000	= 1,296,000
10	× 7,200	= 72,000
11	× 360	= 3,960
17	× 20	= 340
0	× 1	= 0
	Total days	= 1,372,300

Then add the GMT correlation to the total number of days.

1,372,300 + 584,283 = 1,956,583

This number is a Julian day.

To convert a Julian day to a Proleptic Gregorian calendar date:

From this number, subtract the nearest smaller Julian Day Number (in the table below), in this case 1,940,206, which corresponds to the year 600 CE.

year	JDN:	year	JDN:
1	1,721,060	1100	2,122,827
100	1,757,585	1200	2,159,351
200	1,794,109	1300	2,195,876
300	1,830,633	1400	2,232,400
400	1,867,157	1500	2,268,924
500	1,903,682	1600	2,305,448
600	1,940,206	1700	2,341,973
700	1,976,730	1800	2,378,497
800	2,013,254	1900	2,415,021
900	2,049,779	2000	2,451,545
1000	2,086,303		

1,956,583 – 1,940,206 = 16,377

Next, divide this number by 365 days (vague year).

16,377 / 365 = 44.86849

The remainder is 44.86849 years, which is 44 years and 317 days. The full year date is 644 CE. Now calculate the month and day number, taking into account leap days over the 44 years. In the Gregorian Calendar, every fourth year is a leap year with the exception of centuries not evenly divisible by 400 (e.g. 100, 200, 300). When the year is divisible by 400 (e.g. 400, 800, etc.), do not add an extra day. The calculated year is 644 CE. The number of leap days, keeping in mind that the year 600 is not a leap year, is 10. Subtracting that from 317 remainder days is 307; in other words, the 307th day of the year 644 CE, which is November 3. To summarize: the Long Count date 9.10.11.17.0 corresponds to November 3, 644 CE, in the Proleptic Gregorian calendar.

To convert a Julian day to a Julian/Gregorian astronomical date (Proleptic Julian calendar before 46 BCE):

Use an astronomical algorithm such as the Method of Meeus to convert the Julian day to a Julian/Gregorian date with astronomical dating of negative years: (Note: Astronomical algorithms calculate a day as a decimal number equal to a day and a fraction of a day. The Julian date starts at noon. Astronomical dating has a year 0. In historical dating the year 1 BCE is followed by the year 1 CE. Astronomical years before 0 are written with a negative sign. For example, the year 3114 BCE is the year −3113 astronomical.)

In this example:

input: Julian day J
J = J + 0.5    // 1,956,583.5
Z = integer part of J           // 1,956,583
F = fraction part of J          // 0.5

if Z < 2,299,161 then // Julian?
    A = Z
else
    alpha = floor((Z - 1,867,216.25) / 36,524.25)   // 15
    A = Z + 1 + alpha - floor(alpha / 4.0)          // 2,436,129
    // The floor operation rounds a decimal number down to the next lowest integer.
    // For example, floor(1.5) = 1 and floor(−1.5) = -2
end if

B = A + 1524                     // 1,958,107
C = floor((B - 122.1) / 365.25)  // 5,360
D = floor(365.25 × C)            // 1,957,740
E = floor((B - D) / 30.6001)     // 11
day = B - D - floor(30.6001 × E) + F   // 31.5

if E < 14 then
    month = E - 1   // 10
else
    month = E - 13
end if

if month > 2 then
    year = C - 4716    // 644
else
    year = C - 4715
end if

return (year, month, day)

In this example the Julian date is noon October 31, 644. The Method of Meeus is not valid for negative year numbers (astronomical), so another method such as the method of Peter Baum should be used.

=== Calculating a full Long Count date ===
Chichen Itza Initial Series inscription. This date (glyphs A2, B2, ..., A5) is 10.2.9.1.9 9 Muluk 7 Sak, equivalent to July 28, 878 (GMT Gregorian).

A full Long Count date not only includes the five digits of the Long Count, but the 2 character Tzolkʼin and the two-character Haabʼ dates as well. The five digit Long Count can therefore be confirmed with the other four characters (the "calendar round date").

Taking as an example a Calendar Round date of 9.12.2.0.16 (Long Count) 5 Kibʼ (Tzolkʼin) 14 Yaxkʼin (Haabʼ). One can check whether this date is correct by the following calculation.

It is perhaps easier to find out how many days there are since 4 Ajaw 8 Kumkʼu and show how the date 5 Kibʼ 14 Yaxkʼin is derived.

9	× 144000	= 1296000
12	× 7200	= 86400
2	× 360	= 720
0	× 20	= 0
16	× 1	= 16
	Total days	= 1383136

=== Calculating the Tzolkʼin date portion ===
The Tzolkʼin date is counted forward from 4 Ajaw. To calculate the numerical portion of the Tzolkʼin date, add 4 to the total number of days given by the date and then divide total number of days by 13.

(4 + 1,383,136) / 13 = 106,395 (and 5/13)

This means that 106,395 whole 13 day cycles have been completed and the numerical portion of the Tzolkʼin date is 5.

To calculate the day, divide the total number of days in the long count by 20 since there are twenty day names.

1,383,136 / 20 = 69,156 (and 16/20)

This means 16 day names must be counted from Ajaw. This gives Kibʼ. Therefore, the Tzolkʼin date is 5 Kibʼ.

=== Calculating the Haabʼ date portion ===
The Haabʼ date 8 Kumkʼu is the ninth day of the eighteenth month. There are 17 days to the start of the next year.

Subtract 17 days from the total, to find how many complete Haabʼ years are contained.

1,383,136 − 17 = 1,383,119

Divide by 365:

1,383,119 / 365 = 3,789 and (134/365)

Therefore, 3,789 complete Haabʼ have passed and the remainder 134 is the 135th day in the new Haabʼ, since a remainder of 0 would indicate the first day.

Find which month the day is in. Dividing the remainder 134 by 20, is six complete months and a remainder of 14, indicating the 15th day. So, the date in the Haabʼ lies in the seventh month, which is Yaxkʼin. The fifteenth day of Yaxkʼin is 14, thus the Haabʼ date is 14 Yaxkʼin.

So the date of the long count date 9.12.2.0.16 5 Kibʼ 14 Yaxkʼin is confirmed.

== Piktuns and higher orders ==
There are also four rarely used higher-order periods above the bʼakʼtun: piktun, kalabtun, kʼinchiltun and alautun. All of these words are inventions of Mayanists. Each one consists of 20 of the lesser units. (Note: "... we have clear evidence that the current Bakʼtun cycle does not conclude at 13, as the last one did, but advances to 20. In other words, 13.0.0.0.0 will be followed by 14.0.0.0.0, 15.0.0.0.0, and so on to 19.0.0.0.0 . A text at the site of Palenque, Mexico, makes this very plain when it records the completion of 1 Piktun, the next unit above the Bakʼtun, in 4772 CE.)

Many inscriptions give the date of the current creation as a large number of 13s preceding 13.0.0.0.0 4 Ahau 8 Kumkʼu. For example, a Late Classic monument from Coba, Stela 1. The date of creation is expressed as 13.13.13.13.13.13.13.13.13.13.13.13.13.13.13.13.13.13.13.13.0.0.0.0, where the units are 13s in the nineteen places larger than the bʼakʼtun. Some authors think that the 13s were symbolic of a completion and did not represent an actual number.

Most inscriptions that use these are in the form of distance dates and Long Reckonings – they give a base date, a distance number that is added or subtracted and the resulting Long Count.

The first example below is from Schele (1987). The second is from Stuart (2005 pp. 60, 77)

Palenque Temple of the Cross, tablet, Schele (1987 p.)
12.19.13.4.0 8 Ajaw 18 Tzek in the prior era
6.14.0 Distance number linking to the "era date"
13.0.0.0.0 4 Ajaw 8 Kumkʼu

Palenque Temple XIX, South Panel G2-H6 Stuart (2005 pp. 60, 77)
12.10.1.13.2 9 Ikʼ 5 Mol (seating of GI in the prior era)
2.8.3.8.0
1.18.5.3.2 9 Ikʼ 15 Keh (rebirth of GI, this date also in Temple of the Cross)

The tablet of the inscriptions contains this inscription:
9.8.9.13.0 8 Ajaw 13 Pop
10.11.10.5.8
1.0.0.0.0.8

The Dresden codex contains another method for writing distance numbers. These are Ring Numbers. Specific dates within the Dresden codex are often given by calculations involving Ring Numbers. Förstemann identified these, but Wilson (1924) later clarified the way in which they operate. Ring Numbers are intervals of days between the Era Base date 4 Ajaw 8 Kumkʼu and an earlier Ring Base date, where the place-holder for the numeral of days in the interval is circled by an image of a tied red band. Added to this earlier Ring Base date is another count of days forward, which Thompson refers to as a Long Round, leading to a final date within the Long Count that is given as an entry date to be used within a specific table in the codex.

Ring number (12) 12.12.17.3.1 13 Imix 9 Wo (7.2.14.19 before (13) 13.0.0.0.0)
distance number (0) 10.13.13.3.2
Long Count 10.6.10.6.3 13 Akʼbal 1 Kankʼin

Ring number (portion of the DN preceding era date) 7.2.14.19
Add Ring number to the ring number date to reach 13.0.0.0.0

Thompson contains a table of typical long reckonings after Satterwaite.

The "Serpent Numbers" in the Dresden codex pp. 61–69 is a table of dates using a base date of 1.18.1.8.0.16 in the prior era (5,482,096 days).

== See also ==
- Aztec calendar
- Maya astronomy
- Maya calendar
- Maya codices
- Mesoamerican calendars

== Bibliography ==
- Boot, Eric (2002). "The Dos Pilas-Tikal Wars from the Perspective of Dos Pilas Hieroglyphic Stairway 4" (PDF). Mesoweb. Articles.
- Bricker, Harvey M.; Bricker, Victoria R. (2011). Astronomy in the Maya Codices. Philadelphia: American Philosophical Society. ISBN 978-0-87169-265-8.
- Coe, Michael D. (1992). Breaking the Maya Code. London and New York: Thames & Hudson. ISBN 0-500-05061-9. OCLC 26605966.
- Coe, Michael D.; Koontz, Rex (2002). Mexico: from the Olmecs to the Aztecs (5th, revised and enlarged ed.). London and New York: Thames & Hudson. ISBN 0-500-28346-X. OCLC 50131575.
- Coe, Michael D.; Van Stone, Mark L (2005). Reading the Maya Glyphs. London: Thames & Hudson. ISBN 978-0-500-28553-4.
- Diehl, Richard (2004). The Olmecs: America's First Civilization. Ancient peoples and places series. London: Thames & Hudson. ISBN 0-500-02119-8. OCLC 56746987.
- Freidel, David; Schele, Linda; Parker, Joy (1993). Maya Cosmos: Three thousand years on the shaman's path. New York: William Morrow. ISBN 0-68810-081-3. OCLC 27430287.
- Giron-Abrego, Mario (2012). "An Early Example of the Logogram TZUTZ at San Bartolo" (PDF). Wayeb. Wayeb Notes.
- Graham, John A. (1992). J.P. Laporte; H. Escobedo; S. Brady (eds.). "Escultura en bulto Olmeca y Maya en Takʼalik Abʼaj: Su desarrollo y portento" (PDF). IV Simposio de Investigaciones Arqueológicas en Guatemala, 1990 (in Spanish). Guatemala: Museo Nacional de Arqueología y Etnología: 325–334. Archived from the original (PDF) on December 11, 2009.
- Gronemeyer, Sven (2006). "Glyphs G and F: Identified as aspects of the Maize God" (PDF). Wayeb Notes. 22: 1–23. ISSN 1379-8286.
- Kelley, David H. (2005). Exploring Ancient Skies: an Encyclopedic Survey of Archaeoastronomy. Berlin: Springer Verlag. ISBN 0-387-95310-8.
- Kelley, David H. (2008). "Archaeoastronomy". In Deborah M. Pearsall (ed.). Encyclopedia of Archaeology, Vol. 1: A. Oxford: Academic Press. pp. 451–64. ISBN 978-0-12-548030-7. OCLC 2007931569.
- MacDonald, G. Jeffrey (March 27, 2007). "Does Maya calendar predict 2012 apocalypse?" (online edition). USA Today. McLean, VA: Gannett Company. p. 11D. ISSN 0734-7456.
- Pérez de Lara, Jorge; Justeson, John (2005). "Photographic Documentation of Monuments with Epi-Olmec Script/Imagery". The Foundation Granting Department: Reports Submitted to FAMSI. Foundation for the Advancement of Mesoamerican Studies, Inc. (FAMSI).
- Recinos, Adrián (1953). The Annals of the Cakchiquels Translated from the Cakchiquel Maya by Adrián Recinos and Delia Goetz. Translated by Goetz, Delia (1st ed.). Norman: University of Oklahoma Press. pp. 3–165.
- Saturno, William A.; Stuart, David; Beltran, Boris (2006). "Early Maya Writing at San Bartolo, Guatemala". Science. 311 (5765): 1281–1283. Bibcode:2006Sci...311.1281S. doi:10.1126/science.1121745. PMID 16400112. S2CID 46351994.
- Schele, Linda (1992). "A New Look at the Dynastic History of Palenque". In Victoria R. Bricker (Volume), with Patricia A. Andrews (ed.). Supplement to the Handbook of Middle American Indians, Vol. 5: Epigraphy. Victoria Reifler Bricker (general editor). Austin: University of Texas Press. pp. 82–109. ISBN 0-292-77650-0. OCLC 23693597.
- Schele, Linda; Freidel, David (1990). A Forest of Kings: The Untold Story of the Ancient Maya (pbk reprint of 1990 ed.). New York: Harper Perennial. ISBN 0-688-11204-8. OCLC 145324300.
- Thompson, J. Eric S. (1929). "Maya Chronology: Glyph G of the Lunar Series". American Anthropologist. New Series. 31 (2): 223–231. doi:10.1525/aa.1929.31.2.02a00010. ISSN 0002-7294. OCLC 51205515.
- Thompson, J. Eric S. (1971). Maya Hieroglyphic Writing, an Introduction (3rd ed.). Norman, OK: University of Oklahoma Press. ISBN 978-0-8061-0447-8.
- van Stone, Mark L. (2010). 2012: Science and Prophecy of the Ancient Maya. California: Tlacaelel Press. ISBN 978-0-9826826-0-9.
- Voss, Alexander W.; Kremer, H. Juergen (2000). "Kʼakʼ-u-pakal, Hun-pik-tokʼ and the Kokom: The Political Organisation of Chichen Itza" (PDF). 3rd European Maya Conference (1998).
- Wagner, Elizabeth (2006). "Maya Creation Myths and Cosmology". In Nikolai Grube (ed.). Maya: Divine Kings of the Rain Forest. Eva Eggebrecht and Matthias Seidel (assistant eds.). Cologne: Könemann. pp. 280–293. ISBN 3-8331-1957-8. OCLC 71165439.
