= Genevieve (given name) =

- Pronunciation: English: /ˈdʒɛnɪviːv/ French: [ʒənvjɛv]
- Gender: Female

Origin
- Origin: French
- Meaning: "Woman of the race, tribe"

Genevieve (French: Geneviève) is a female name of "Celtic or Germanic origin, possibly from the Germanic name Kenowefa [Latinized as Genoveva], meaning kin, 'race' or 'tribe', and wefa, 'woman'". Genevieve can also mean "woman of the family".

== People with this name ==
- Sainte Geneviève, French saint (Patron saint of Paris) in Catholicism and Eastern Orthodoxy
- Genevieve Angelson (born 1987), American TV and film actress
- Genevieve Armstrong (born 1988), New Zealand rower
- Genevieve Artadi (born 1982), American singer and producer
- Genevieve Beacom (born 2004–2005), Australian baseball pitcher
- Geneviève Behrend (1881–1960), French-born author and teacher
- Genevieve Behrent (born 1990), New Zealand rower
- Genevieve Bell, vice-chancellor of ANU
- Geneviève Biron, Canadian civil servant in Quebec
- Genevieve Blatt (1913–1996), American judge and politician
- Geneviève Brunet (1930–2025), French actress
- Geneviève Robic-Brunet (born 1959), Canadian cyclist
- Geneviève Bujold (born 1942), Canadian actress
- Geneviève Castrée (1981–2016), Canadian comics artist, illustrator, and musician
- Geneviève Élisabeth Disdéri (c.1817–1878), early French photographer
- Genevieve Chappell (born 1972), American television personality
- Geneviève Dulude-De Celles, Canadian film director
- Genevieve Feinstein (1913–2006), American mathematician, cryptanalyst, NSA Hall of Honor recipient
- Geneviève Fraisse (born 1948), French feminist philosopher
- Geneviève de Gaulle-Anthonioz (1920–2002), member of the French Resistance
- Genevieve Gaunt (born 1991), Dutch-English actress
- Geneviève Gemayel (1908–2003), Lebanese political figure
- Genevieve Gorder (born 1974), American television host and interior designer
- Genevieve Grotjan Feinstein (1913–2006), American mathematician and cryptanalyst
- Geneviève Guitel (1895–1982), French mathematician and historian of mathematics
- Geneviève Hafner, French photographer based in New York City
- Geneviève Halévy (1849–1926), French salonnière
- Genevieve Hannelius (born 1998), American teen actress, also known as G Hannelius
- Genevieve Hughes (1932–2012), American Freedom Rider
- Geneviève Jeanningros (born c. 1942/1943), a French-Argentine Catholic nun
- Geneviève Jourdain (1945–2006), engineer, professor and researcher, worked on development of signal processing
- Gen Kitchen, British politician
- Geneviève Lacambre (born 1937), French heritage curator
- Genevieve Lipsett (1885–1935) – Canadian journalist, teacher and suffragist
- Geneviève Meurgues (1931–2021), French explorer, museum curator and conservator
- Genevieve Mina (born 1996), American politician
- Genevieve Morton (born 1986), South African model
- Genevieve Mushaluk (born 1991), Canadian lawyer and Survivor 47 contestant
- Genevieve Nnaji (born 1979), Nigerian actress
- Genevieve O'Reilly (born 1977), Irish actress
- Genevieve Oswald (1921–2019), American dance scholar and archivist
- Genevieve Padalecki (born 1981), American actress
- Geneviève Page (1927–2025), French actress
- Geneviève de Peyras (died 1732), French perfumer
- Genevieve Pezet (1913–2009), American-born French artist
- Geneviève Savalette (1735–1795), French playwright and actress
- Genevieve Schatz, American singer
- Geneviève Serreau (1915–1981), French stage actress and playwright
- Geneviève Simard (born 1980), Canadian alpine skier
- Genevieve Fallon Steefel (1899–1971), American civic leader
- Genevieve Valentine (born 1981), American science fiction and fantasy writer
- Genevieve Vaughan (born 1939), American semiotician, peace activist, feminist, and philanthropist
- Geneviève Vergez-Tricom (1889–1966), French geographer and historian
- Genevieve M. Walton (1857–1932), American librarian
- Genevieve Westcott (1955–2020), New Zealand journalist and television presenter
- Genevieve Woo (born 1969), Singaporean television news presenter

== Fictional characters ==
- Genevieve, a vintage car, title character of the British film Genevieve
- Genevieve, the dog in Madeline's Rescue by Ludwig Bemelmans
- Princess Genevieve, main protagonist in the animated film Barbie in the 12 Dancing Princesses
- Genevieve Atkinson in the American CBS soap opera The Young and the Restless
- Genevieve Delacroix in the Netflix television series Bridgerton
- Geneviève Emery in the French film Les Parapluies de Cherbourg, played by Catherine Deneuve
- Genevieve Selsor in the book The Martian Chronicles by Ray Bradbury
- Genevieve Villard in CrossGen Comics' Sigilverse
- Geneviève from Emily in Paris
- Geneviève in the movie Rush Hour 3
- "Sweet Lady Genevieve", a 1973 song by the Kinks
- Genevieve from To All the Boys I've Loved Before by Jenny Han
- Genevieve Mirren-Carter, in the American TV show Brooklyn Nine-Nine
- Genevieve, helicopter on display in Air and Space Museum Bell Model 30 Ship 1A
- Genevieve Mercier, protagonist of Seven Days in June by Tia Williams
- Geneviève, from the short story "The Mask", published in The King in Yellow
- Genevieve Terhoven, from The Black Obelisk
- Genevieve Moss, from Everything's Gonna Be Okay

== See also ==
- Genoveva (given name)
- Genovefa
- Genoveffa
- Genowefa (disambiguation)
