= Genevieve (disambiguation) =

Genevieve may refer to:

- Genevieve, a saint in Roman Catholic and Eastern Orthodox traditions, patron saint of Paris, France
- Genevieve (musician) (b. 1987), an American indie pop singer
- Genevieve (actress) (1920–2004), a French-born American comedian, singer, and actress
- Genevieve of Brabant, a heroine of medieval legend
- Genevieve Garvan Brady, American philanthropist and Papal duchess
- Genevieve (given name), a given name for females
- Genevieve Range, a mountain range on Vancouver Island, British Columbia, Canada
- Genevieve (film), a 1953 British film
- Genevieve (album), a 2004 album by Velvet Cacoon, or the title track
- "Genevieve", a song by Wishbone Ash from the album Twin Barrels Burning
- USS Genevieve (SP-459), a United States Navy ferry in commission from 1918 to 1919
- Genoveva, an opera by Schumann
- Geneviève (Bruneau)

== See also ==
- Sainte-Geneviève, various buildings and place names
- Hurricane Genevieve (2014)
- Genoveva (given name)
- Genovefa
- Genoveffa
- Genowefa (disambiguation)
