= Olmec hieroglyphs =

Signs found on the Cascajal Block

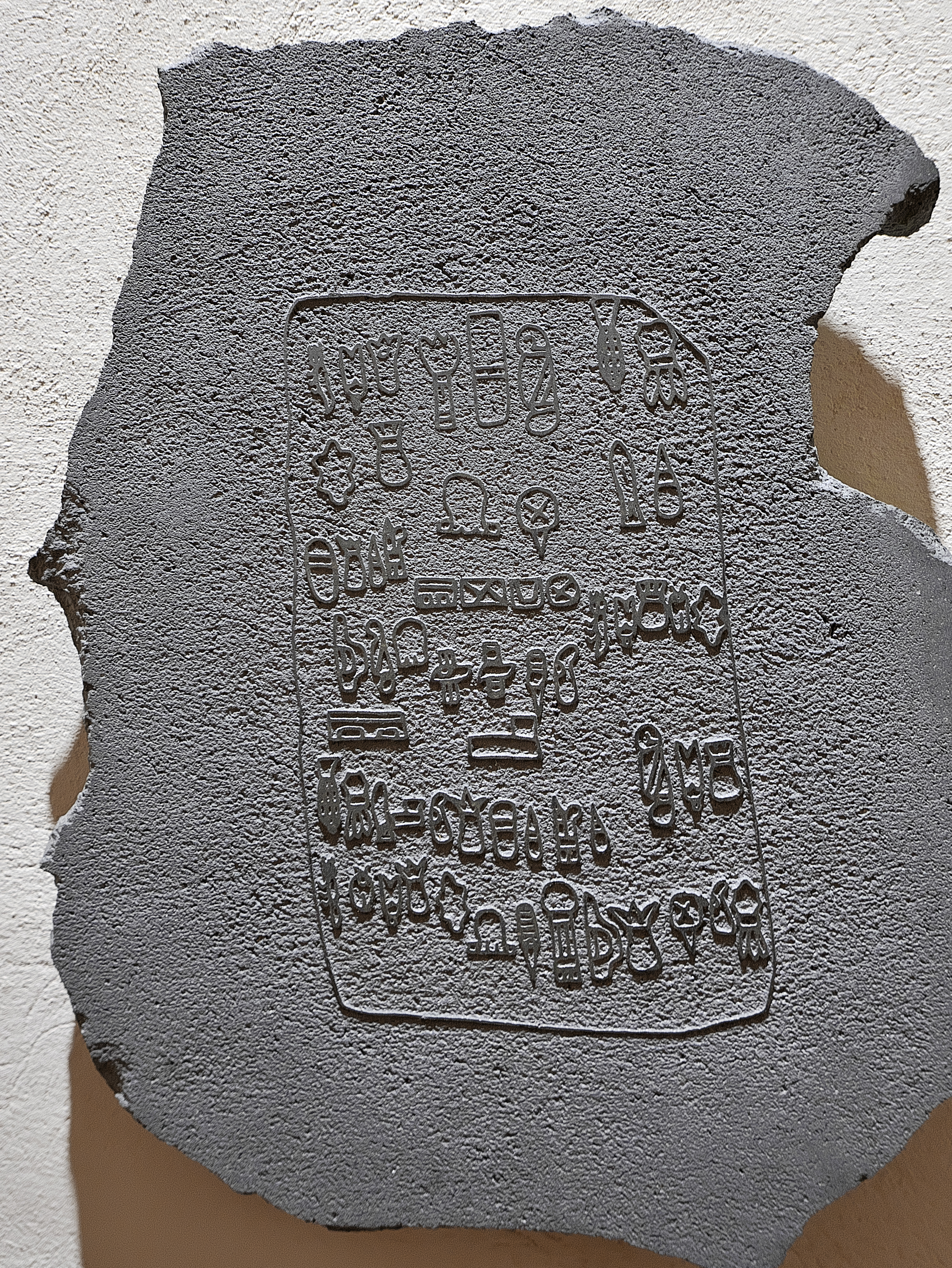
- Replica of the Cascajal block, found in Jáltipan, Veracruz and dated c. 900 BCE.
- Script type: Undeciphered (maybe logographic or proto-writing)
- Period: c. 900 BCE - 400 BCE
- Language: Mixe–Zoque languages?

Related scripts
- Parent systems: Proto-writing: Olmec hieroglyphs
- Child systems: Isthmian script

Olmec hieroglyphs are a set of glyphs developed within the Olmec culture. The Olmecs were the earliest known major Mesoamerican civilization, flourishing during the formative period (1500–400 BCE) in the tropical lowlands of the modern-day Mexican states of Veracruz and Tabasco. The subsequent Epi-Olmec culture (300 BCE to 250 CE), was a successor culture to the Olmec and featured the Isthmian script, which has been characterized as a full-fledged writing system, though with its partial decipherment being disputed.

There is no scholarly consensus whether Olmec hieroglyphs represent language, or are a system of proto-writing; the possible existence of writing during Middle and Late Olmec periods has been a matter of long-standing debate. Direct evidence includes the appearance of individual (potential) glyphs as well as the singleton Cascajal Block that bears a potential text. Indirect evidence includes similarities in calendar and writing systems between subsequent Mesoamerican cultures, for which the Olmecs are sometimes considered a mother culture.

== Periodization ==
=== Cascajal block (c. 900 BCE) ===
The 62 glyphs of the Cascajal block

In September 2006, a report published in Science magazine announced the discovery of the Cascajal block, a writing-tablet-sized block of serpentine with 62 characters unlike any yet seen in Mesoamerica. This block was discovered by locals in the Olmec heartland and was dated by the archaeologists to approximately 900 BCE based on other debris. If the authenticity and date can be verified, this will prove to be the earliest writing yet found in Mesoamerica. The symbols on the Cascajal block are unlike those of any other writing system in Mesoamerica, such as in Mayan languages or Isthmian, another extinct Mesoamerican script. The Cascajal block is also unusual because the symbols apparently run in horizontal rows and "there is no strong evidence of overall organization. The sequences appear to be conceived as independent units of information". The 28 unique Cascajal block characters bear no obvious resemblance to later glyphs. If indeed, it has been a script, the Cascajal block script "apparently left no descendants, with no certain link to Isthmian or other Formative [period] writing." (Skidmore 2007, p. 5)

=== Middle Formative toponyms (900–500 BCE) ===
All Mesoamerican writing systems feature toponyms, i.e. "emblems or graphic images, which join distinct elements into meaningful arrangements but do not directly codify any specific set of sounds". These toponyms seem to have been employed in Olmec-style art since the Middle Formative period (900–500 BCE), but the degree to which they constitute writing (i.e., record spoken language) is debated. Possible toponyms include two examples from Guerrero, a possible place sign from Oxtotitlán Cave, Guerrero, an incised greenstone celt from unknown provenance and a tablet from Ahuelican.

=== Potential glyphs (650–400 BCE) ===
It was long thought that many of the glyphs present on Olmec monumental sculpture represented an early Olmec script. "If writing is (1) a graphic representation of language, (2) detached from the body of its referent, and (3) disposed into linear sequences that can theoretically expand into greater degrees of syntactic complexity, then writing first appears in Mesoamerica in the century between 600 and 500 BC, as attested on La Venta Monument 13', the so-called "Ambassador Monument" (tentatively dated to 650 – 450 BCE, resp. 600-400 BCE, for an image see the Linda Schele photograph collection).

Aside from monumental sculpture, potential glyphs have been found on portable objects such as celts (notably the Humboldt Celt dated to c. 450 BCE), sherds, etc. However, several glyphs clearly continue symbols previously established in iconography rather than writing (this may include the aforementioned toponyms), so that their use for recording spoken language can only be ascertained if multiple potential glyphs appear in combination.

San Andrés glyphs. The top set of glyphs have been interpreted as "3 Ajaw". The bottom two glyphs were found incised into semi-precious greenstone artifacts.

A rollout of the San Andrés cylinder seal, showing the bird possibly "speaking" the name "3 Ajaw"

In 2002, one such glyph group was confirmed for two possible glyphs at San Andres: Excavations conducted in 1997 and 1998 produced three artifacts that many archaeologists contend demonstrate that the Olmec civilization used a true writing system. These artifacts, dated roughly to 650 BCE (the middle of the Olmec concentration at La Venta and San Andres), were found in a refuse dump, the remains from a festival or feast. “The fact that the artifacts with glyphs were found in the context of feasting refuse suggest that writing among the Olmec was sacred and was closely tied to ritual activities.” The most important find was a fist-sized ceramic cylinder seal, likely used to print cloth. When rolled out, the seal shows two speech scrolls emanating from a bird, followed directly by a number of design elements enframing what has been interpreted as logograms for “king (sideways U shape),” "3 (three dots, according to the Mesoamerican bar and dots numbering system),” and “Ajaw (from the sacred 260-day calendar)", a designation used for both a calendar date and, in keeping with Mesoamerican custom, the name of an Olmec ruler. In addition to the ceramic cylinder seal, two fingernail-sized fragments from a greenstone plaque have been recovered, each containing an incised glyph. Both these glyphs have been linked to well-documented glyphs in other Mesoamerican writing systems, including the Isthmian (Epi-Olmec) and Maya scripts.

Well-known archaeologist and writer Michael D. Coe interprets the San Andres glyphs as "an early kind of writing" while Richard A. Diehl, who excavated at the Olmec site of San Lorenzo Tenochtitlan with Coe, finds that this discovery "establishes the existence of Olmec writing and calendrics by 650 B.C.E" On the other hand, Mayanist epigrapher David Stuart stated that it would be hard to discern evidence of a writing system in a handful of symbols. The question was complicated in 2006 by the discovery of the Cascajal Block. The 28 unique Cascajal block characters bear no obvious resemblance to the San Andres glyphs and are, indeed, unlike those of any other Mesoamerican writing system. Questions concerning the interpretation of the San Andrés glyphs (and the Cascajal block) will need to await further research.

A cylinder seal from Tlatilco, dated to a time frame of Olmec occupation, appears to carry a non-pictographic, linear script. A cylinder seal from Chiapa de Corzo, Mexico, also appears to be an example of an unknown Mesoamerican script. Both have been discussed as potential evidence for Olmec writing as they appeared during a time of Olmec influence.

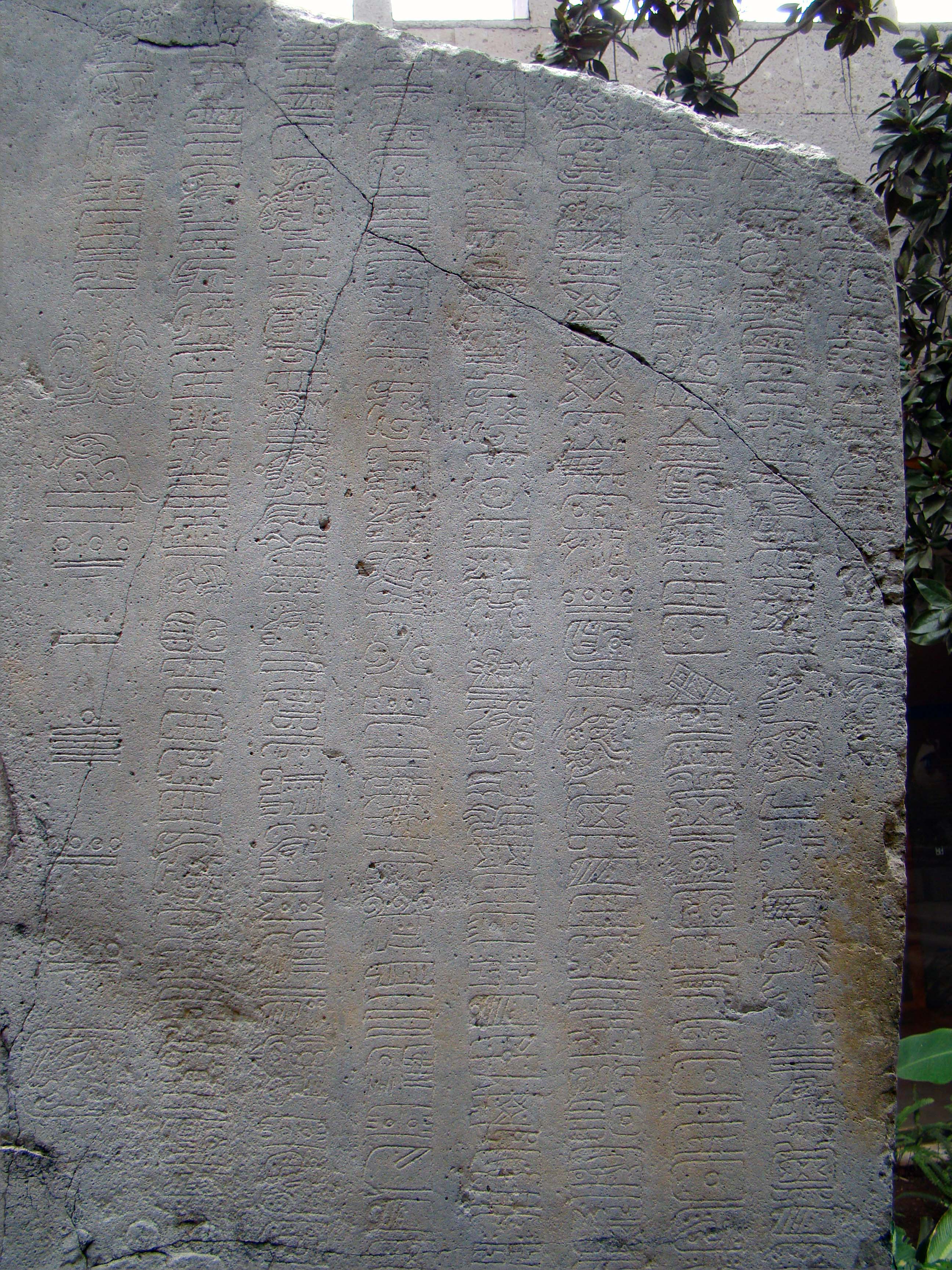
Detail showing glyphs from 2nd century CE La Mojarra Stela 1 currently located at the Museum of Anthropology of Xalapa, Veracruz, Mexico. The left column gives a Long Count date of 8.5.16.9.9, or 162 CE. The other columns are glyphs from the Epi-Olmec script.

=== Epi-Olmec or Isthmian script (after 300 BCE) ===
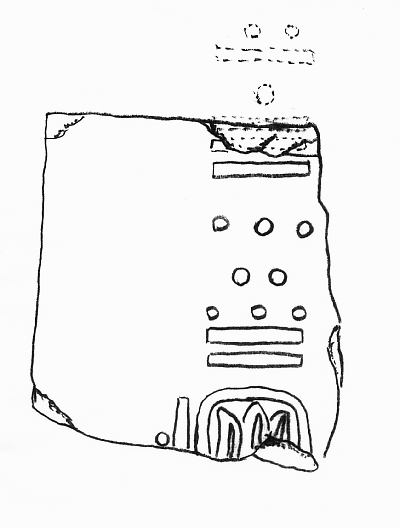
Chiapa de Corzo Stela 2, showing the date of 7.16.3.2.13, or December 36 BCE, the earliest Mesoamerican Long Count calendar date yet found.

A small number of Epi-Olmec artifacts found in the Isthmus of Tehuantepec show examples of an early Mesoamerican writing system which “may itself descend from an Olmec hieroglyphic system, but too little of the Olmec script has been recovered to confirm or disprove a connection”.

The longest of these texts are on La Mojarra Stela 1 and the Tuxtla Statuette. The writing system used is very close (and possibly ancestral) to the Maya script, using affixal glyphs and Long Count dates, but is read only in one column at a time as is the Zapotec script. An Epi-Olmec stela from Chiapa de Corzo is the oldest monument of the Americas inscribed with its own date: the Long Count dates it to 36 BCE. A sherd from Chiapa de Corzo dated to 300 BCE was held to be the oldest instance of that writing system yet discovered, but more recently, it has been suggested that early Isthmian writing at Chiapa de Corzo even pre-dates the Epi-Olmec culture.

In a 1997 paper, John Justeson and Terrence Kaufman put forward a decipherment of Epi-Olmec. The following year, however, their interpretation was disputed by Stephen Houston and Michael D. Coe, who unsuccessfully applied Justeson and Kaufman's decipherment system against Epi-Olmec script from the back of a hitherto unknown mask. The matter remains under dispute.
