= Proto-writing =

Symbols that communicate ideas but not language

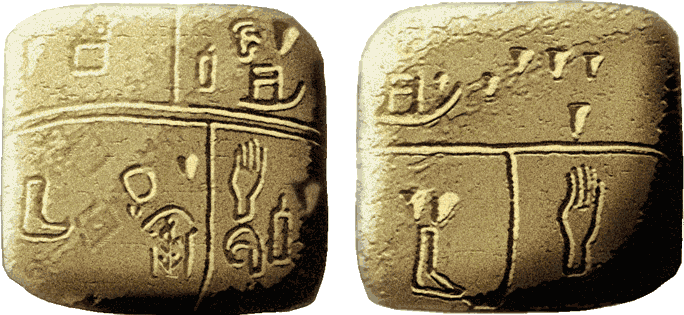
The Kish tablet, bearing pictographic symbols. Some of the symbols are written in a “…seemingly archaic form…” according to the CDLI entry.

Proto-writing consists of visible marks communicating limited information. Such systems emerged from earlier traditions of symbol systems in the early Neolithic, as early as the 7th millennium BC China and southeastern Europe. Some of the earliest known evidence of proto-writing dates to over 40,000 years ago. Proto-writing used ideographic or early mnemonic symbols or both to represent a limited number of concepts, in contrast to true writing systems, which record the language of the writer.

== Paleolithic ==
In 2022, a team led by amateur archaeologist Bennett Bacon presented an analysis of lines, dots and "Y"-like symbols on Upper Paleolithic cave paintings as indicating the mating cycle of animals in a lunar calendar. The markings found in over 400 caves across Europe were compared to the mating cycles of the animals with which they were associated, showing a correlation with the month of the year in which the animals depicted in the cave paintings would typically give birth. The markings were 20,000 years old, predating attested proto-writing systems by 10,000 years. In 2026, researchers at Saarland University published a study with evidence of proto-writing from over 40,000 years ago in central Europe.

== Neolithic ==
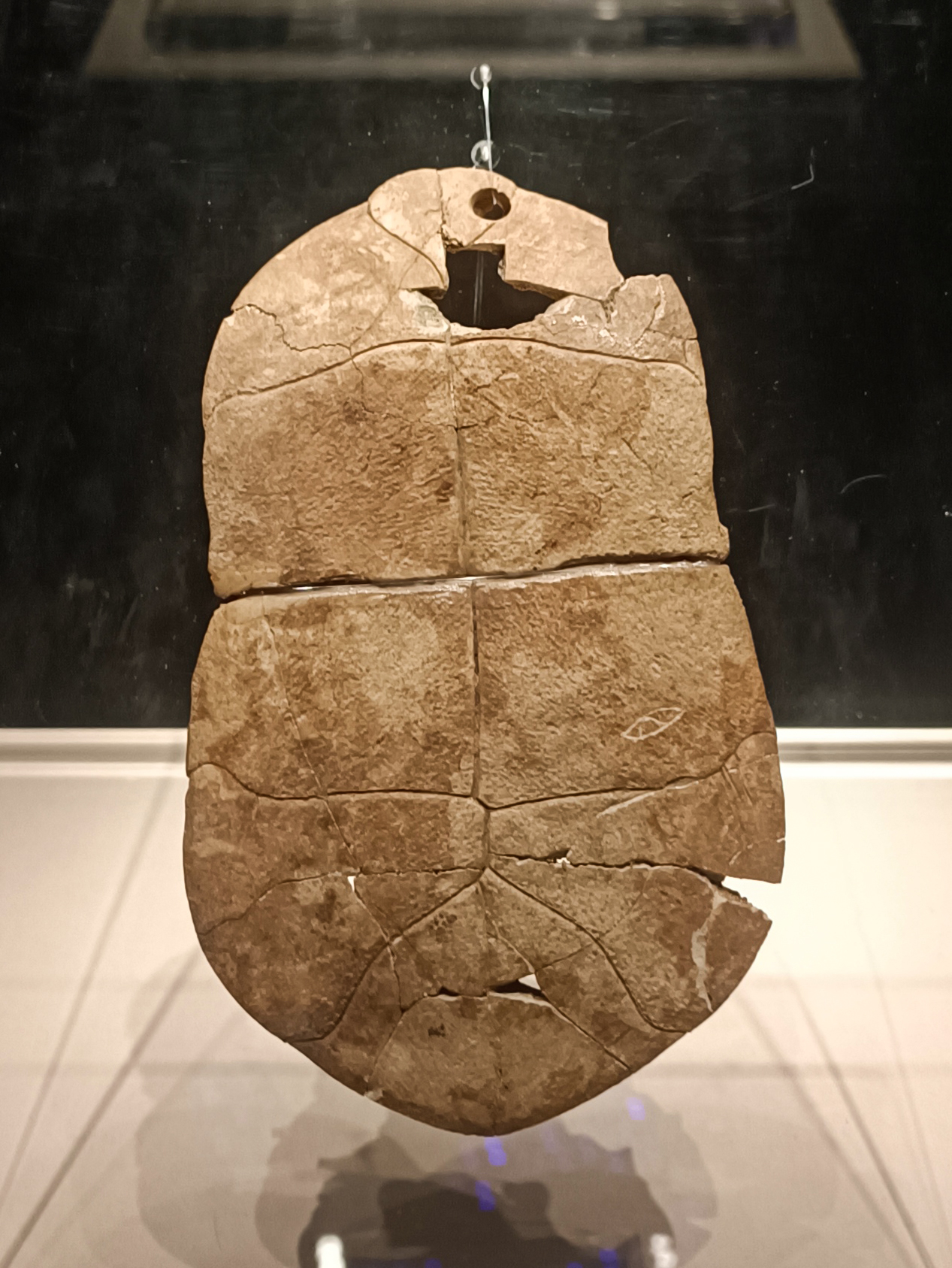
Turtle plastron from Jiahu inscribed with an eye-like symbol

=== Neolithic China ===
In 2003, turtle shells with carved inscriptions featuring a library of symbols were found in 24 Neolithic graves excavated at Jiahu in the northern Chinese province of Henan. Using radiocarbon dating, the inscriptions have been dated to the 7th millennium BC. According to some archaeologists, the symbols bear a resemblance to the first attested oracle bone inscriptions dating to c. 1200 BC. Others have dismissed this claim as insufficiently substantiated, claiming that simple geometric designs such as those found on the Jiahu shells cannot be linked to early writing.

=== Neolithic Southeastern Europe ===
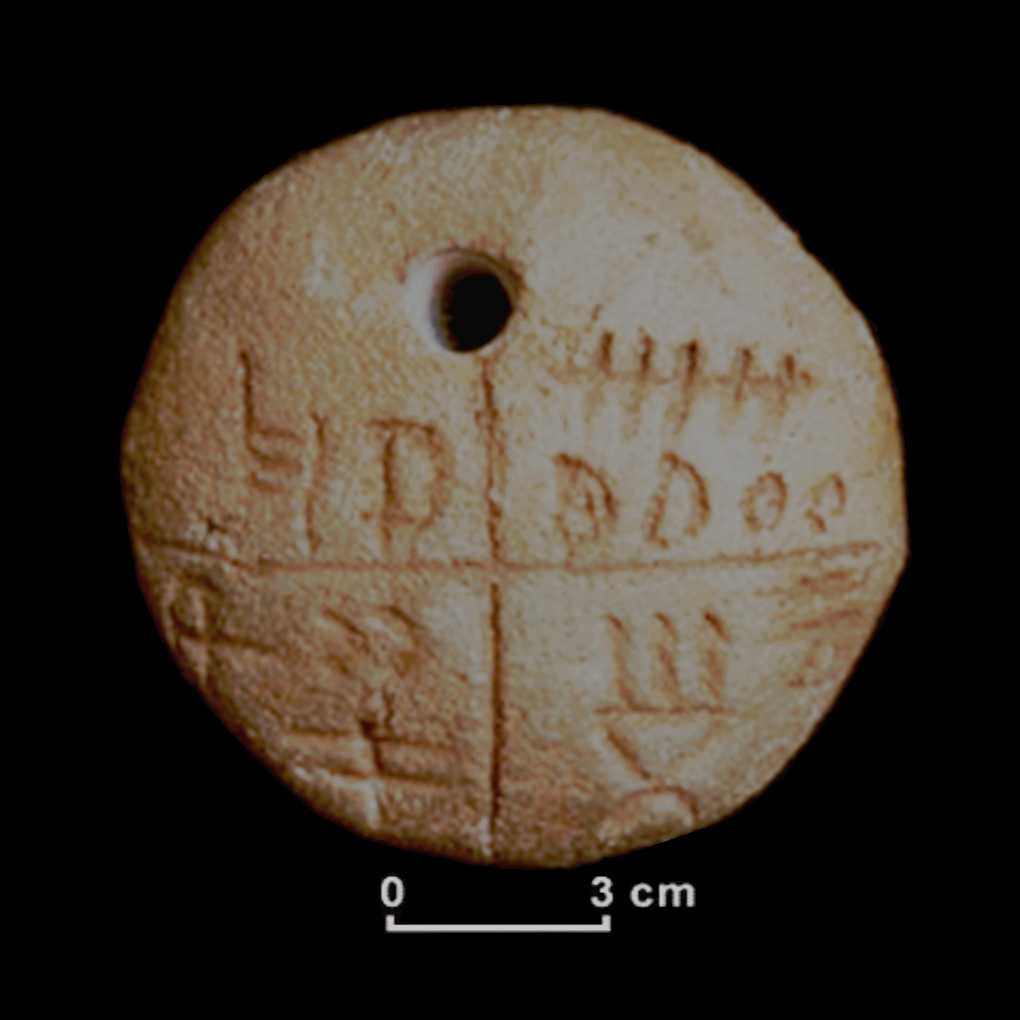
Clay amulet, one of the Tărtăria tablets, dated to c. 5300 BC

The Vinča symbols (6th–5th millennia BC) are an evolution of simple undeciphered symbols first attested during the 7th millennium BC from Vinča culture. Over time, the symbols gradually became more complex, ultimately culminating in the Tărtăria tablets (c. 5300 BC). The symbols went out of use around 3500 BC.

They have sometimes been described as an example of proto-writing, with most scholars agreeing that the symbols indicate ownership or other information, but do not record any language.

Another example of proto-writing might be recorded on the Dispilio Tablet in Greece (6th millennium BC), however, as of 2025, there has not been a proper academic publication on that artifact yet.

== Chalcolithic and Early Bronze Age ==
During c. 3600 – c. 3200 BC, proto-writing in the Fertile Crescent was gradually evolving into cuneiform, the earliest mature writing system.

=== Mesopotamia ===
According to some scholars, the proto-cuneiform tablets (c. 3350–3000 BC) reflects the stage of writing, when what would become the cuneiform script of Sumer was still in the proto-writing stage, because it was a system based on numerical and logographic signs, lacking phonetic signs (or only a few). This system was not intended to record a language. The transitional stage to a proper writing system takes place during the first centuries of the Early Dynastic Period (c. 2900–2700 BC).

=== Egypt ===
A similar development took place in the genesis of the Egyptian hieroglyphs. Various scholars believe that Egyptian hieroglyphs "came into existence a little after Sumerian script, and ... probably [were] ... invented under the influence of the latter ...", although it is pointed out and held that "the evidence for such direct influence remains flimsy" and that "a very credible argument can also be made for the independent development of writing in Egypt ..."

== Bronze Age ==
During the Bronze Age, the cultures of the Ancient Near East are known to have had fully developed writing systems, while the marginal territories affected by the Bronze Age, such as Europe, India and China, remained in the stage of proto-writing.

The Chinese script emerged from proto-writing in the Chinese Bronze Age, during about the 14th to 11th centuries BC (Oracle bone script), while symbol systems native to Europe and India are extinct and were replaced by descendants of the Semitic abjad during the Iron Age.

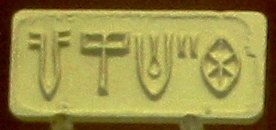
Typical "Indus script" seal impression showing an "inscription" of five characters

=== Indian Bronze Age ===
The Indus script is a symbol system that emerged during the end of the 4th millennium BC in the Indus Valley Civilisation.

=== European Bronze Age ===
With the exception of the Aegean and mainland Greece (Linear A, Linear B, Cretan hieroglyphs), the early writing systems of the Near East did not reach Bronze Age Europe. The earliest writing systems of Europe arise in the Iron Age, derived from the Phoenician alphabet.

However, there are number of interpretations regarding symbols found on artefacts of the European Bronze Age which amount to interpreting them as an indigenous tradition of proto-writing. Of special interest in this context are the Central European Bronze Age cultures derived from the Beaker culture in the second half of the 2nd millennium BC. Interpretations of the markings of the bronze sickles associated with the Urnfield culture, especially the large number of so-called "knob-sickles" discovered in the Frankleben hoard, are discussed by Sommerfeld (1994). Sommerfeld favours an interpretation of these symbols as numerals associated with a lunar calendar.

== Mesoamerica ==
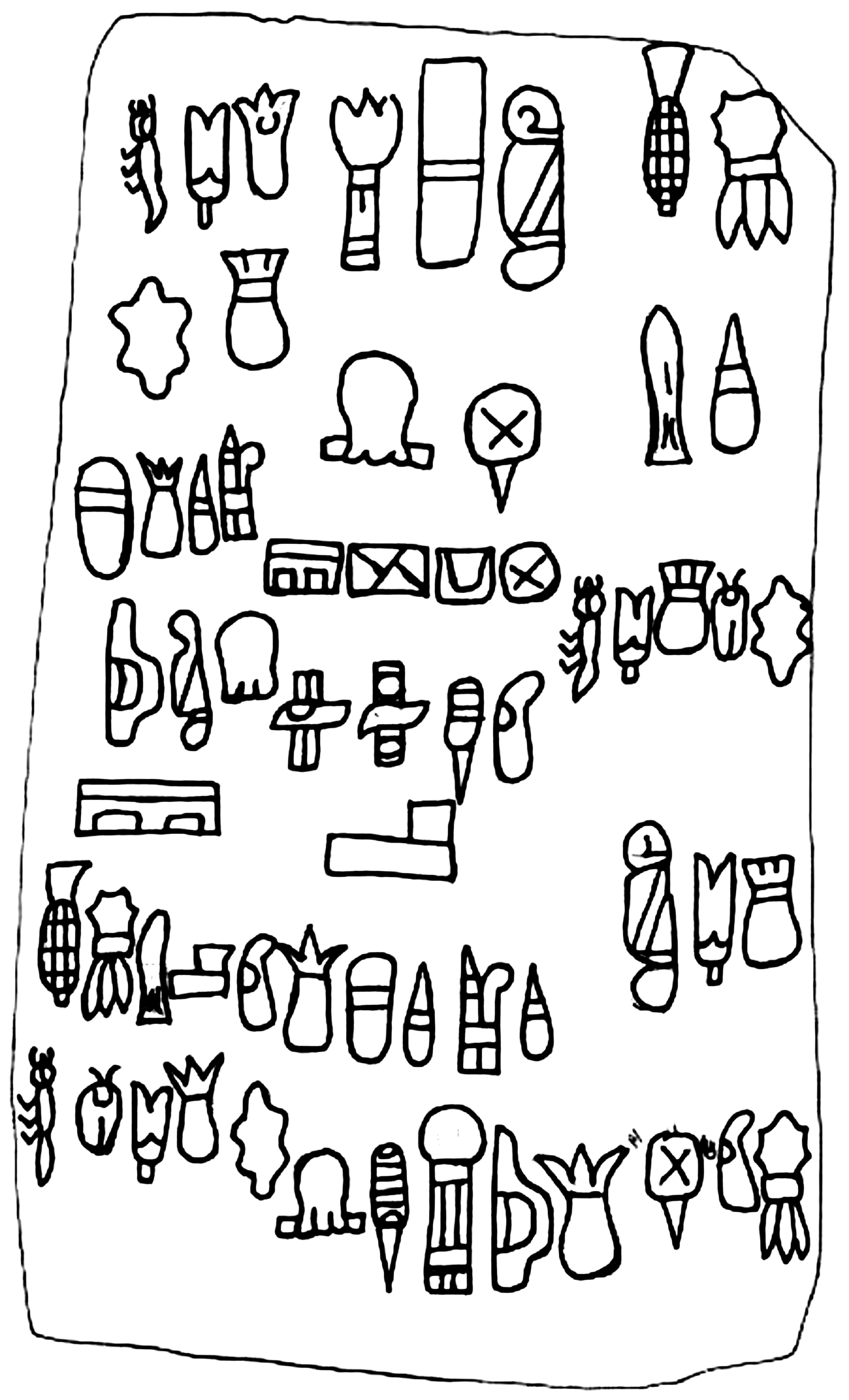
The Cascajal block, dated c. 900 BCE and associated with Olmec hieroglyphs.

Andean and Mesoamerican civilizations and writing systems arose independently of each other, and of other cradles of civilization in the Old World. While the Andean quipu record-keeping system has been described as a very peculiar form of proto-writing, the indisputable proto-writing systems native to America are found in the Mesoamerican zone. The earliest attested form is Olmec hieroglyphs (900 BCE - 400 BCE). The decline of Olmec civilization gave rise to the Epi-Olmec or Isthmian script, which remains undeciphered as of 2026, and its classification — as proto-writing or as true writing — is a source of debate. Regardless, the same Mesoamerican tradition eventually produced the Maya script (300 BCE - 1600 CE), found to have been a fully-fledged writing system, after its decipherment in the 1950s and 1960s by Yuri Knorozov.

Other closely-related Mesoamerican inscriptions whose nature is debated, or which are widely regarded as proto-writing, include the Zapotec script (500 BCE - 700 CE), Mixtec logograms (1200 BCE - 1700 CE) and Aztec picograms.

== Later proto-writing ==
Even after the Bronze Age, several cultures went through a period of using systems of proto-writing as an intermediate stage before the adoption of writing proper. The "Slavic runes" (7th/8th century) mentioned by a few medieval authors may have been such a system. Another example is the system of pictographs invented by Uyaquk before the development of the Yugtun syllabary (c. 1900).

=== African Iron Age ===
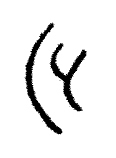
Nsibidi character for "welcome"

Nsibidi is a system of symbols indigenous to what is now Igboland. While there remains no commonly accepted exact date of origin, most researchers agree that use of the earliest symbols date back between the 5th and 15th centuries. There are thousands of Nsibidi symbols which were used on anything from calabashes to tattoos and to wall designs. Nsibidi is used for the Ekoid and Igboid languages, and the Aro people are known to write Nsibidi messages on the bodies of their messengers.

== See also ==
- Asemic writing
- Cylcon
- History of ancient numeral systems
- History of communication
- History of writing
- Message stick
- Megalithic graffiti symbols
- Petroglyph
- Prehistoric counting
- Quipu
- Rongorongo
- Visual language

== Sources ==
- Kruk, Janusz; Milisauskas, Sarunas (2002). "Middle Neolithic, Continuity, Diversity, Innovations, and Greater Complexity, 5500/5000–3500/3000 BC". In Milisauskas, Sarunas (ed.). European Prehistory: A Survey (1^{st} ed.). Springer. pp. 193–246. ISBN 978-0-306-46793-6.
- Lazarovici, Gheorghe; Merlini, Marco (2016). "Tărtăria Tablets: The Latest Evidence in an Archaeological Thriller". In Nikolova, Lolita; Merlini, Marco; Comsa, Alexandra (eds.). Western-Pontic Culture Ambience and Pattern: In memory of Eugen Comsa. Warsaw, Poland: De Gruyter Open Poland. pp. 53–142.
- Owens, Gareth A. (1999). "Balkan Neolithic Scripts". Kadmos. 38 (1–2): 114–120. doi:10.1515/kadm.1999.38.1-2.114. S2CID 162088927.
