= Cascajal Block =

1st millennium BCE slab bearing Olmec inscriptions

The 62 glyphs of the Olmec Cascajal Block

The Cascajal Block is a tablet-sized slab serpentinite dated to the early first millennium BCE, incised with previously unknown characters that have been claimed to represent the earliest writing system in the New World. Archaeologist Stephen D. Houston of Brown University said that this discovery helps to "link the Olmec civilization to literacy, document an unsuspected writing system, and reveal a new complexity to [the Olmec] civilization."

== Discovery ==
The Cascajal Block was discovered by road builders in the late 1990s in a pile of debris in the village of Lomas de Tacamichapan in the Veracruz lowlands in the ancient Olmec heartland on the southeastern coast of Mexico. The block was found amidst ceramic shards and clay figurines and from these the block is dated to the San Lorenzo Tenochtitlán phase, which ended c. 900 BCE, preceding the oldest Zapotec writing dated to c. 500 BCE. Archaeologists Carmen Rodriguez and Ponciano Ortiz of the National Institute of Anthropology and History of Mexico examined and registered it with government historical authorities. It weighs about 11.5 kilograms (25 lb) and measures 36 by 21 by 13 centimetres (14.2 in × 8.3 in × 5.1 in). Details of the find were published by researchers in the 15 September 2006 issue of the journal Science.

== Analysis ==
The Olmec flourished on the Gulf Coast of Mexico c. 1250–400 BCE. The evidence for the Cascajal writing system is based solely on the text on the Cascajal Block, but existence of a system of Olmec hieroglyphs has been postulated independently from the Cascajal Block on the basis of previous discoveries of glyphs individually or in small groups. Their relation with the Cascajal Block is unclear.

The block holds a total of 62 glyphs, some of which resemble plants such as maize and pineapple, or animals such as insects and fish. Many of the symbols are more abstract boxes or blobs. The symbols on the Cascajal block are unlike those of any other writing system in Mesoamerica, such as in Mayan languages or Isthmian, another extinct Mesoamerican script. The Cascajal block is also unusual because the symbols apparently run in horizontal rows and "there is no strong evidence of overall organization. The sequences appear to be conceived as independent units of information". All other known Mesoamerican scripts typically use vertical rows.

=== Authors of the report ===
- Stephen D. Houston, who also worked on the study, said the text, if decoded, will decipher "earliest voices of Mesoamerican civilization." "Some of the pictographic signs were frequently repeated, particularly ones that looked like an insect or a lizard." Houston suspected that "these might be signs alerting the reader to the use of words that sound alike but have different meanings—as in the difference between 'I' and 'eye' in English." He concluded, "the linear sequencing, the regularity of signs, the clear patterns of ordering, they tell me this is writing. But we don't know what it says."
- "This is extremely important because we never recognized this writing system, until this discovery," said archaeologist Karl Taube of the University of California, Riverside, who was involved in the documentation and publication of the discovery. "We've known they have very elaborate art, and iconography, but this is the first strong indication that they had visually recorded speech."
- For Richard Diehl of the University of Alabama, the discovery announced in the journal Science amounted to rock-solid proof that the Olmecs had a form of writing. Diehl has believed "all along" that the Olmecs possessed the ability to write and discovery of the stone "corroborates my gut feelings."

=== Interpretations ===
- William Saturno, not involved in the study, agreed with Houston that the horizontally arranged inscription shows patterns that are the hallmarks of true writing, including syntax and language-specific word order. "That's full-blown, legitimate text—written symbols taking the place of spoken words," said Saturno, a University of New Hampshire anthropologist and expert in Mesoamerican writing.
- Mary Pohl at Florida State University is an expert on the Olmec. She said "One sign looks actually like a corn cob with silk coming out the top. Other signs are unique, and never before seen, like one of an insect... These objects—and thus probably the writing—had a special value in rituals…We see that the writing is very closely connected with ritual and the early religious beliefs, because they are taking the ritual carvings and putting them into glyphs and making writing out of them. And all of this is occurring in the context of the emergence of early kings and the development of a centralized power and stratified society."
- David Stuart, a University of Texas at Austin expert in Mesoamerican writing, was not connected with the discovery, but reviewed the study for Science. He said "To me, this find really does bring us back to this idea that at least writing and a lot of the things we associate with Mesoamerican culture really did have their origin in this region."
- Lisa LeCount, an associate professor of archaeology at the University of Alabama, theorized that, if it is a crown, it might have been carved into the stone to establish leadership. "The stone could have been used as a tool by an emerging king to validate his exalted position and to legitimize his right to the throne. Only the elite in that society would have known how to read and write." LeCount said there should be no question that the Olmecs represented the "mother culture" and predated the Mayans, whose writings and buildings remain to this day.
- Caterina Magni, an associate professor of Prehispanic Archaeology at the Paris-Sorbonne University, proposed a religious and ritual reading of the text as describing an initiation rite, expressing "an extremely sophisticated manner of thinking." In 2014 Magni argued that the glyphs belong to the Olmec vocabulary and demonstrate that the Olmecs had writing; she also proposed a dictionary of Olmec glyphs and symbols.

=== Skepticism of interpretation ===
- David Freidel and F. Kent Reilly III proposed, in 2010, that, rather than a unique script, the Cascajal Block in fact represents a special arrangement of sacred objects used in ancient times for magical purposes. They propose that the incised symbols on the block represent the contents of three sacred bundles arranged in three separate registers from top to bottom. These sacred bundles include well known objects used in magic and divination rituals. Many of these objects/signs, arranged horizontally within the registers, are present in all three registers. The whole block is to be read in boustrophedon fashion from top to bottom and alternatively left to right and right to left. Freidel and Reilly argue that the majority of the symbols on the block are found in the established corpus of Middle Formative Period art and many are otherwise part of iconographically comprehensible compositions that are designed to be read pictographically and not as script encoding spoken language. Rather than to regard the Cascajal Block as an epistemological dead-end—the conclusion if it is identified as a unique script—they identify the block as a key to understanding a special arrangement of sacred objects presented in the course of a religious ritual. The purpose of this may have been to memorialize the acts of divination or other magical rituals. This was a pervasive ritual practice well attested in the archaeology of Formative period Mesoamerica.

=== Skepticism of authenticity ===
Some archaeologists are skeptical of the tablet:

- For David Grove, an archaeologist at the University of Florida in Gainesville who was not involved in the research, the tablet "looked like a fake to me because the symbols are laid out in horizontal rows," unlike the region's other writing systems, he said.
- Archaeologist Christopher Pool of the University of Kentucky in Lexington said in 2010 "I've always been a little skeptical of it." "For one, it's unique," he continued. Another critical issue, Pool adds, is that when Rodriguez and Ortiz retrieved the tablet, it was already removed from the ground, taking it out of its original archaeological context."
- Max Schvoerer, professor at Michel de Montaigne University, and founder of the Laboratoire de Physique appliquée à l'Archéologie, said "Unfortunately, the authors determined the age of the block only indirectly, by studying ceramics shards found at the site, in the absence of a well identified and dated level of occupation."

=== Formal criticism ===
The most comprehensive criticism was published in the journal Science, the publisher of the original study, on 9 March 2007. In a letter, archaeologists Karen Bruhns and Nancy Kelker raise five points of concern:

1. The block was found in a pile of bulldozer debris and cannot be reliably dated.
2. The block is unique. There is no other known example of Olmec drawing, much less writing, on a serpentine slab.
3. All other Mesoamerican writing systems are written either vertically or linearly. The glyphs on the block are arranged in neither format but instead "randomly bunch".
4. As pointed out by the original authors, some of the glyphs do appear on other Olmec artifacts, but have never been heretofore identified as writing, only as decorative motifs.
5. "What we can only describe as the 'cootie' glyph (#1/23/50) fits no known category of Mesoamerican glyph and, together with the context of the discovery, strongly suggests a practical joke".

A rebuttal to the criticism by the authors of the original study was published directly following the letter:

1. Other critical language finds, as well as the Rosetta Stone, were also found without provenance.
2. Such inscriptions are faint and may as yet be unseen on previously discovered slabs.
3. The signs are in a "purposeful" pattern.
4. "All known hieroglyphic systems in the world relate to pre-existing iconography or codified symbolism", and therefore it is not surprising that the Cascajal glyphs appear in other contexts as motifs.
5. The 'cootie' glyph can be found in "three-dimensional" form on San Lorenzo Monument 43.

=== Archaeometric analyses ===
A 2019 study by Joshua D. Englehardt et al. made an effort to establish the origin of the block via archaeometric techniques. Their findings supported the authenticity of the block as an Olmec-age artifact based on several qualities:

- Polynomial texture mapping (PTM) reveals additional marks on certain glyphs. This allows signs 5 and 57 to be reinterpreted as "knuckleduster" and "torch" motifs, which are apparent in other Olmec art, including other signs on the Cascajal Block. PTM additionally indicates the presence of asymmetrical wear patterns, such as diagonal surface abrasions superimposed onto certain glyphs, and heavier wear on the right side of the block.
- X-ray fluorescence (XRF) spectrometry indicates that the block is geologically indistinguishable from serpentinite sourced from Tehuitzingo, Puebla, a site which has acted as the source quarry for other Olmec artifacts. Moreover, the surface of the block is covered with a uniform patina depleted in silicon and magnesium. This is likely a consequence of weathering regimes in moist luvisols with high salinity and mild acidity. The block was reportedly discovered in a depositional environment which fits this combination of features. In such conditions, the silica bonds at the surface of a serpetinite object are broken down and replaced with magnesium carbonate through hydrolysis reactions. Both the silica and magnesium carbonate would dissolve away on a timescale exceeding a thousand years.
- SEM imaging of polymer molds show microscopic lines which the authors identify as manufacturing traces. The inscribed side of the slab is covered with fine, irregular, and diffuse lines between 0.6 and 1.3 μm in width. These types of traces are inferred to be incisions produced via sharpened obsidian tools, by comparison to other Olmec artifacts and the results of modern experimental archaeology. The uninscribed surface is ornamented with lines at a width of 3.5 μm and 10 μm, similar to those produced experimentally by sandstone abrasion. Previous studies have suggested that the combination of obsidian incision and sandstone abrasion are characteristic of Olmec toolworkers in the Middle Formative Period.

== See also ==
- San Andrés – an Olmec site where artifacts related to another proposed Olmec writing system have been found
- Maya writing system
- Mesoamerican chronology
- San Lorenzo Tenochtitlán
- Isthmian script
