= Caterina Magni =

Italian-born French archaeologist and anthropologist

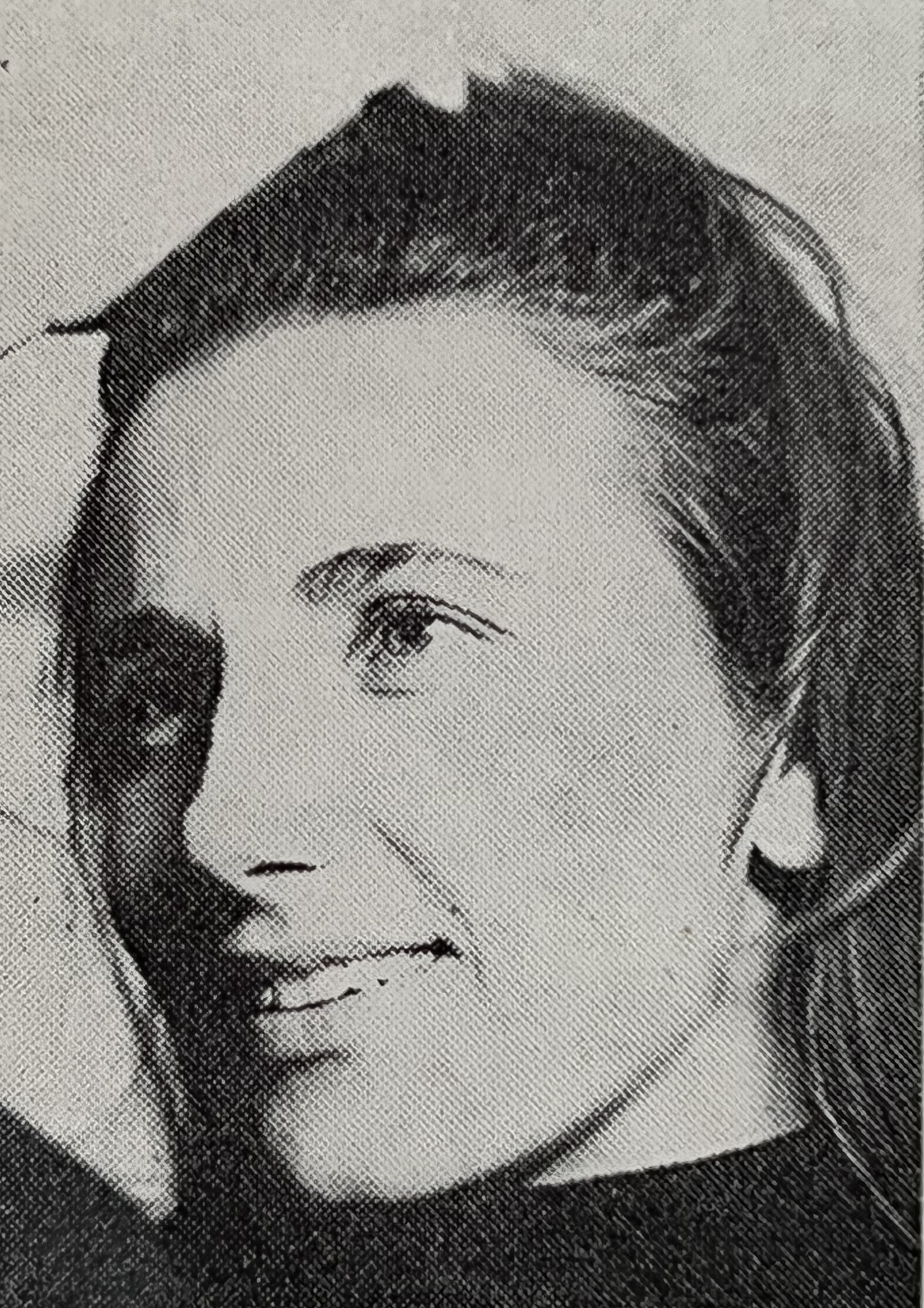

Caterina Magni (born 1966) is an Italian-born archaeologist and anthropologist, who specialises in the study of pre-Columbian cultures of Mesoamerica, and in particular the iconography, art and mythology and religion of the Olmec civilization. From 2001 Magni has held a Maître de conférences (HDR) position in Mesoamerican archaeology at the University of Paris IV: Paris-Sorbonne, Paris.

Caterina Magni has published four monographs on the Olmecs, the first major civilization of Mesoamerica, books on the archaeology of Mexico and Guatemala, as well as works on Easter Island.

She pioneered the study of three-dimensional writing in Olmec and Mesoamerican scripts, and has demonstrated the role these played during the colonial era as well, particularly in connection with the miracle of the “tilma” of the Virgin of Guadalupe (Tepeyac).

Beyond anthropology, archaeology, iconology, and Amerindian academic literature, her specialty, Caterina Magni has edited books on the anthropology of Christianity, particularly on the Virgin of Guadalupe (in French and Spanish), as well as literary works.

She has contributed to edited volumes and published numerous articles (written in French, Spanish, and English) in peer-reviewed international journals (France, Italy, Mexico, etc.).

While pursuing her university studies, she participated in archaeological excavations as an intern, both in France (“Cour Napoléon du Louvre” and “Rue de Lutèce,” Île de la Cité, Paris) and abroad (Tolfa, Rome, Italy; Nasca, Peru; Easter Island, Chile).

 

  

  PREHISPANIC ARCHAEOLOGY, ART & ANTHROPOLOGY

▶ 2023a Les Olmèques. Sur les traces d’un peuple précurseur. Questions/réponses, Volume I, (361 pages), Self-publishing Amazon

▶ 2023b Les Olmèques. Sur les traces d’un peuple précurseur. Questions/réponses, Volume II, (277 pages), Self-publishing Amazon

▶ 2017 Le Guatemala. Sur les pas des ancêtres indiens, Coll. Promenades archéologiques, Éditions Errance/Actes Sud, Arles, France (224 pages with graphic plates and color photos)

▶ 2016 Le Mexique. Voyage au cœur des vestiges préhispaniques, Coll. Promenades archéologiques, Éditions Errance/Actes Sud, Arles, France (231 pages with graphic plates and color photos)

▶ 2014 Les Olmèques. La genèse de l’écriture en Méso-Amérique, Coll. des Hespérides, Éditions Errance/Actes Sud, Arles, France (368 pages with graphic plates and photos)

▶ 2003 Les Olmèques. Des origines au mythe, Éditions Seuil, Paris, France (432 pages with 100 graphic plates and color photos)

▶ 1999 Archéologie du Mexique. Les Olmèques, Éditions Artcom, Paris, France (126 pages with graphic plates)

  

ART, ARCHEOLOGY & ANTHROPOLOGY OF EASTER ISLAND

▶ 2023a L’Île de Pâques. Voyage au bout du monde, Volume I, (195 pages), Self-publishing Amazon

▶ 2023b L’Île de Pâques. Voyage au bout du monde, Volume II, (199 pages), Self-publishing Amazon

▶ 2023c L’Île de Pâques. Voyage au bout du monde, Volume III, (219 pages), Self-publishing Amazon

RELIGIOUS ANTHROPOLOGY OF CHRISTIANITY

▶ 2025a La Virgen del Tepeyac ou la Virgen de Guadalupe, Vol. I, (398 pages), Self-publishing Amazon

▶ 2025b La Virgen del Tepeyac ou la Virgen de Guadalupe, Vol. II, (211 pages), Self-publishing Amazon

▶ 2025c La Virgen del Tepeyac ou la Virgen de Guadalupe, Vol. III, (502 pages), Self-publishing Amazon

▶ 2025d La Virgen del Tepeyac ou la Virgen de Guadalupe, Vol. IV, (477 pages), Self-publishing Amazon

▶ 2024 (1) La foi par petites touches (151 pages), Self-publishing Amazon (paperback)

▶ 2024 (2) La foi par petites touches (155 pages), Self-publishing Amazon (hardcover)

▶ 2024a La Vierge de Tepeyac ou la Vierge de Guadalupe, Vol. I, (361 pages), Self-publishing Amazon

▶ 2024b La Vierge de Tepeyac ou la Vierge de Guadalupe, Vol. II, (203 pages), Self-publishing Amazon

▶ 2024c La Vierge de Tepeyac ou la Vierge de Guadalupe, Vol. III, (461 pages), Self-publishing Amazon

▶ 2024d La Vierge de Tepeyac ou la Vierge de Guadalupe, Vol. IV, (461 pages), Self-publishing Amazon

▶ 2023a L’expérience du sacré. Comment être sauvés sur la terre et dans les cieux, Vol. I, (391 pages), Self-publishing Amazon

▶ 2023b L’expérience du sacré. Comment être sauvés sur la terre et dans les cieux, Vol. II, (417 pages), Self-publishing Amazon

LITERATURE

▶ 2026 Penser l’ombre et la nuée. Album photographique, (478 pages), Self-publishing Amazon

▶ 2025 Rapa Nui et autres récits, (161 pages), Self-publishing Amazon (paperback & hardcover)

▶ 2025 Timothée, le semeur de souvenirs et autres nouvelles, (211 pages), Self-publishing Amazon

(hardcover)

▶ 2023 Timothée, le semeur de souvenirs et autres nouvelles, (227 pages), Self-publishing Amazon

(paperback)

▶ 2022a L’Indien (75 pages), Self-publishing Amazon (reprint)

▶ 2022b Le chardonneret élégant et l’île de l’éternel printemps (123 pages), Self-publishing Amazon

▶ 2022c La ligature des âmes. Itzcitlal, Vol. I, (287 pages), Self-publishing Amazon

▶ 2022d La ligature des âmes. Matlalxochitl, Vol. II, (283 pages), Self-publishing Amazon

▶ 2022e La ligature des âmes. Ome Ollin, Vol. III, (351 pages), Self-publishing Amazon

▶ 1994 L’Indien, Éditions Lettres du Monde, Paris, France (61 pages)

BOOK CHAPTERS

PREHISPANIC ARCHAEOLOGY, ART & ANTHROPOLOGY

▶ 2021 « Splendeur de l’art olmèque », In : Art Précolombien, Collection Liliane et Michel Durand-Dessert, p. 8-26, Musée d’art moderne et contemporain Saint Étienne Métropole, Bernard Chauveau Édition, Paris (Catalog of the exhibition)

▶ 2019 « Le jaguar en Mésoamérique. Une créature aux multiples “visages” », In : Des Lions et des Hommes. Mythes félins : 400 siècles de fascination, p. 106-111, Éditions Gallimard, Paris (Catalog of the exhibition, held from April 6 to September 22, 2019, at Vallon Pont d'Arc, Ardèche, Grotte Chauvet 2)

▶ 2015a « Les masques olmèques. L’art de l’ancien Mexique », In : Masken. Expression of the Spirits (Catalog of the exhibition; translates into English), pp. 140-163, Éd. Martin Doustar, Bruxelles

▶ 2015b « Notices de masques olmèques », In : Masken. Expression of the Spirits (Catalog of the exhibition; in English), pp. 136-139, Éd. Martin Doustar, Bruxelles

▶ 2013 « Notices de pièces olmèques », In : Art précolombien. La collection Barbier-Mueller, Vol. I, pp. 38-39/44/50-51, Éditions 5 Continents y Sotheby’s France, Milan/Paris (French and English bilingual publication)

▶ 2009a « L’héritage des Olmèques », In : 100 000 ans de beauté, Tome II : Antiquité/Civilisations G. Vigarello (dir.), pp. 250-260, Gallimard, Paris, France (coordination of the chapter on Prehispanic America : C. Magni) Book translates into English under the title of : 100 000 Years of Beauty.

▶ 2009b « Le geste comme métaphore », In : 100 000 ans de beauté, Tome II : Antiquité/Civilisations G. Vigarello (dir.), pp. 265-267, Gallimard, Paris, France

▶ 2009c « Jeu de rôles », In : 100 000 ans de beauté, Tome II : Antiquité/Civilisations G. Vigarello (dir;), pp. 270-272, Gallimard, Paris, France

▶ 2006a « Mythologies. Méso-Amérique : images, récits », In : Dictionnaire mondial des images, L. Gervereau (dir.), pp. 722-726, Nouveau Monde Éditions, Paris, France

▶ 2006b « Mythologies. Jaguar (Mexique ancien) », In : Dictionnaire mondial des images, L. Gervereau (dir.), pp. 726-728, Nouveau Monde Éditions, Paris, France

SCIENTIFIC PAPERS

PREHISPANIC ARCHAEOLOGY, ART & ANTHROPOLOGY

▶ 2024 « L’écriture tridimensionnelle mexica », Beaux-Arts Éditions, In : Mexica. Des dons et des dieux au Templo Mayor, p. 23, Musée du quai Branly Jacques Chirac, Paris

▶ 2015a « La gravure olmèque de Xoc. Un épilogue inattendu », Archéologia, n° 537, p. 14, Éditions Faton, Dijon, France

▶ 2015b « L’état des connaissances sur les Olmèques », Questions/answers : interview with Brigitte Postel, Archéologia, n° 533, p. 42-43, Éditions Faton, Dijon, France

▶ 2014 « El sistema de pensamiento olmeca, México : originalidad y especificidades. El código glifíco y el lenguaje corporal », Cuicuilco, 21 : 60 : 9-44, ENAH, México

▶ 2011 « Les civilisations mères d’Amérique », Dossier Pour la Science, 72 : 22-29, Paris, France

▶ 2009 « Portfolio : notices de pièces olmèques », Arts & Cultures, 10 : 268-273, Éd. Somogy, Musée Barbier-Mueller, Genève/Barcelone, Spain/Switzerland (article translates into English and Spanish)

▶ 2008a « Olmec Writing. The Cascajal Block : New Perspectives », Arts & Cultures, 9 : 64-81, Éd. Somogy, Musée Barbier-Mueller, Genève/Barcelone, Spain/Switzerland (on-line article on the nord-american website : FAMSI)

▶ 2008b « L’écriture olmèque. La stèle de Cascajal : nouvelles perspectives de recherche », Arts & Cultures, 9 : 64-81, Éd. Somogy, Musée Barbier-Mueller, Genève/Barcelone, Spain/Switzerland (on-line article for the members of the association “Amis du Musée Barbier-Mueller” translates into Spanish)

▶ 2008c « El glifo en tres dimensiones. Agua y fuego : un Leitmotiv del simbolismo olmeca », In : Olmeca. Balance y perspectivas. Memoria de la Primera Mesa Redonda, 1 : 245-262, M. T. Uriarte et R. González Lauck (dir.), INAH-UNAM, Mexico City, Mexico (publication accompanied with a DVD)

▶ 2000 « Sur les traces de la mutilation olmèque, Mexique », In : De la blessure corporelle à la mutilation symbolique dans le monde amérindien, Ateliers de Caravelle, 17 : 7-33, C. Magni (dir.), IPEALT, Université Toulouse-Le Mirail, Toulouse, France

▶ 1999 « Analisis del complejo iconografico empuñadura-antorcha en el arte olmeca, México » In : XVII° Congreso Internacional de Historia de las Religiones, 1995, CD Rom-ENAH, Mexico, Mexico

▶ 1998a « Sur-vol d’un ailleurs amérindien. Usage des stupéfiants dans l’univers sacré olmèque, Mexique », Lares, 4 : 467-489, Ed. Leo S. Olschki, Firenze, Italy

▶ 1998b « Du système mythique au système visuel. Essai d’analyse structuraliste de l’imagerie olmèque, Mexique », Lares, 3 : 325-350, Ed. Leo S. Olschki, Firenze, Italy

▶ 1998c « Imagerie de la caverne-miroir dans l’art du Mexique ancien », Caravelle, 70 : 5-28, IPEALT, Université Toulouse-Le Mirail, Toulouse, France

▶ 1997a « Langage symbolique olmèque : les mosaïques de La Venta », Lares, 2 : 259-267, Ed. Leo S. Olschki, Firenze, Italy

▶ 1997b « Coyolxauhqui et le were-jaguar : de l’objet d’art au mythe », Cahiers des Amériques Latines, 25 : 171-180, IHEAL, Paris, France

▶ 1997c « Analyse du complexe iconographique "poignée-torche" dans l’art olmèque, Mexique et analyse de sa survivance dans l’art mésoaméricain plus tardif », Lares, 1 : 67-88, Ed. Leo S. Olschki, Firenze, Italy

▶ 1996-‘97 « La créature composite dans l’art mésoaméricain. Essai d’interprétation iconographique », Recherches amérindiennes au Québec, 26 : 3-4 : 65-73, Montréal, Canada

▶ 1995 « El simbolismo de la cueva y el simbolismo solar en la iconografía olmeca, México », Cuicuilco, 1 : 3 : 89-126, ENAH, Mexico City, Mexico

▶ 1994 « Identification et fonction de l’animal dans l’art olmèque », Lares, 3 : 339-356, Ed. Leo S. Olschki, Firenze, Italy

She is a member of the Société Archéologique du Midi de la France (SAMF).

== Published works ==
Published works by Magni include:

authored books—

- Magni, Caterina (1999). Archéologie du Mexique: les Olmèques (in French). Paris: Éditions Artcom’. ISBN 2-912741-24-6. OCLC 43630189.
- Magni, Caterina (2003). Les Olmèques: des origines au mythe (in French). Paris: Éditions du Seuil. ISBN 2-02-054991-3. OCLC 52385926.
