= Genoveva (given name) =

Genoveva is a feminine given name. Notable people with the name include:

- Genoveva Añonman (born 1989), Equatoguinean football manager
- Genoveva Virginia Cossoul (1800–1879), Portuguese musician
- Genoveva Dawson, Argentine botanist
- Genoveva Eichenmann (born 1957), Swiss long-distance runner
- Genoveva Matute (1915–2009), Filipino author
- Genoveva Torres Morales (1870–1956), Spanish Roman Catholic nun
- Genoveva Guardiola de Estrada Palma (1858–1926), Honduran-born Cuban politician
- Genoveva Ríos, Bolivian hero
- Genoveva Rivero, Venezuelan model
- Genoveva Forest Tarrat (1928–2007), Spanish activist
- Genoveva de Lima Mayer Ulrich (1886–1963), Portuguese writer and socialite
- Genoveva Umeh, Nigerian actress

== See also ==
- Genoveva
- Genevieve (given name)
- Genovefa
- Genoveffa
- Genowefa (disambiguation)
- Veva (disambiguation)
