= Geneviève de Peyras =

Geneviève de Peyras or Mme. Huet (died 1732) was a French perfumer. She was royal purveyor and supplier of perfume and cosmetics to the French royal family in 1711–1732.

== Life and career ==
She married the Parisian perfumer François Huet the elder, official supplier, or marchande gantière-parfumeuse privilégiée suivant la cour ("priviliged official supplier of cloves and perfumes of the royal court").

Her husband owned an exclusive luxuy shop in Paris and belonged to a family who had the privilege to manufacture and supply the royal family and court with perfume, cloves, fans and different cosmetics such as powder.

When she was widowed in 1711, she inherited the business and office of her late spouse.

She died in Paris in 1732. She left her business to her son François Huet the younger (d. 1754), who was in turn succeeded by his widow Marie-Bénédicte Poton.
