= Tania Velmans =

French art historian (1938–2022)

- Born: 1938; Sofia
- Died: 2022 (aged 83–84)
- Citizenship: France
- Occupation: Art historian

Tania Velmans (1938–2022) was a French art historian born in Sofia. Her research focused on Byzantine art and its influence in the Balkans, particularly in painting.

== Education ==
In Paris, Tania Velmans studied art history under André Grabar at the École pratique des hautes études (graduating in 1964). That same year, she joined the National Center for Scientific Research (CNRS), where she later became a research director. In 1974, she earned her doctorate from the Paris-Sorbonne University with a dissertation titled: La peinture murale byzantine à la fin du Moyen Âge. Scholars from Bulgaria also began collaborating with her in the early 1970s.

== Career ==
Velmans oversaw the publications Cahiers archéologiques (founded by André Grabar) and Cahiers balkaniques.

== Selected publications ==
- Le Tétraévangile de la Laurentienne : Florence, Laur. VI. 23, Klincksieck, 1971.
- La Peinture murale byzantine à la fin du Moyen âge, Klincksieck, 1977.
- L'art byzantin, Flammarion, 1982.
- (dir.) Contribution à l'étude du Jugement dernier dans l'art byzantin et post-byzantin, INALCO, 1984.
- L'embarquement pour Byzance, Adam Biro, 1992.
- (avec Adriano Alpago Novello) Miroir de l'invisible : peintures murales et architecture de la Géorgie, Zodiaque, 1996.
- (avec Vojislavv Korać et Marica Šuput) Rayonnement de Byzance, Zodiaque, 1999.
- L'art médiéval de l'Orient chrétien, recueil d'études, Picard, 2001.
- Byzance, les slaves et l'Occident, études sur l'art paléochrétien et médiéval, Pindar Press, 2001.
- La fabuleuse histoire de l'icône, récit, éditions du Rocher, 2005.
- L'image byzantine ou la transfiguration du réel. L'espace, le temps, les hommes — la mort, le péché, les doctrines, Hazan, 2009.
