= Veva =

Veva may refer to:

- Vevā, or Viva, Iran
- Veva de Lima (1886–1963), Portuguese writer, socialite and eccentric
- Veva Porter (1910–2008), American printmaker and arts educator

== See also ==
- Genoveva (given name)
