= Genovefa =

The Merovingian name Genovefa is rendered in French as Geneviève.

- Saint Genovefa, patroness of Paris, see Genevieve.
- Genovefa of Brabant, of medieval legend.
- Genovefa Weber (1764-1798), German opera singer

== See also ==
- Genoveffa
- Genoveva
- Genoveva (given name)
- Genowefa (disambiguation)
