= Genevieve Hafner =

French photographer

Geneviève Hafner is a French photographer based in New York City, known mostly for her colorful and spirited photographs of the street scenes of New York City. Her 100+ postcard collection of New York, under Concrete Jungle, has shown many locals and visiting tourists a new way to look at the city.

Hafner's first book Paris-New York, was published in 2003 by OPERAE, V.I.T.R.I.O.L. Factory. It was described by Michael MacInnis in The New York Art World, November 2004 as "Mr. Dimanche's thoughtful prose and Ms. Hafner's contemplative imagery ...together foster a unique, quirky fascination."

Hafner also did free-lance photography work for several neighborhood newspapers in New York, including Manhattan Spirit and Our Town.
