= Geneviève Savalette =

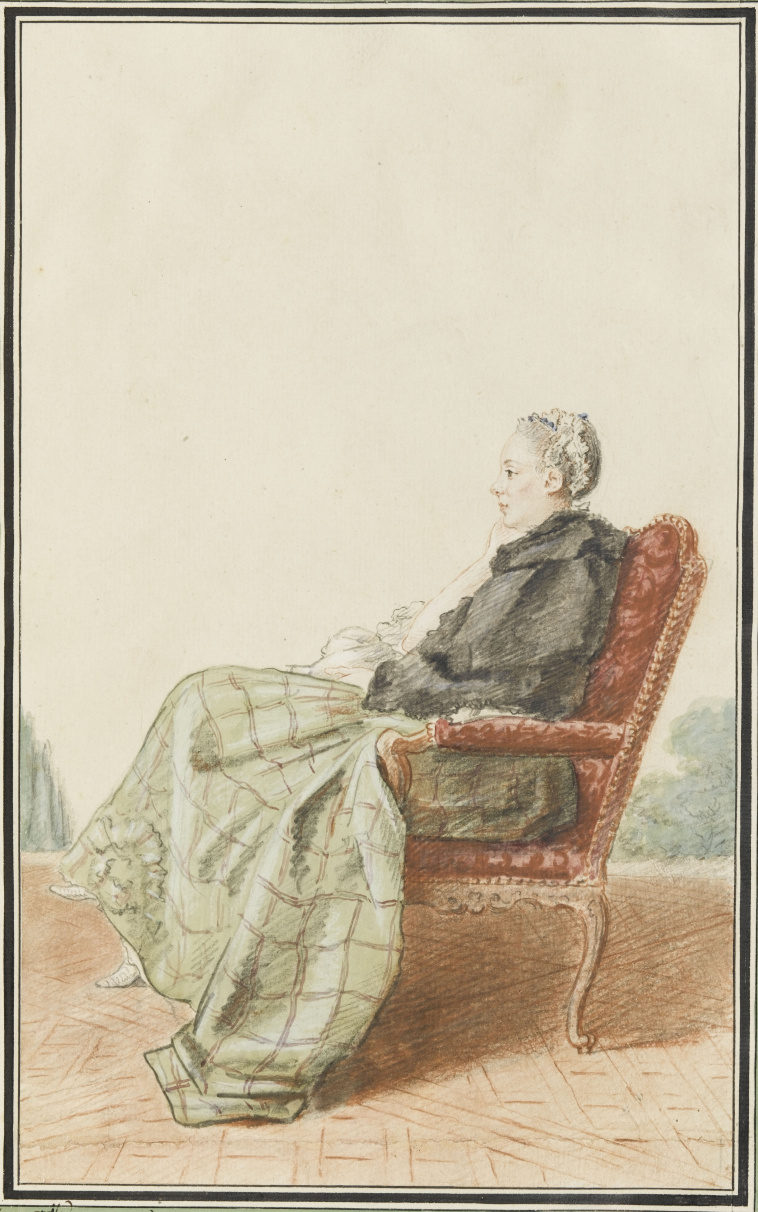
Geneviève Savalette

Geneviève-Charlotte-Agnès Savalette (1735–1795), mainly known as the Marquise de Gléon, was an amateur playwright and actress active in 18th-century society theatre. In her youth, she was part of the court of the Prince of Conti.

== Biography ==
Geneviève was the daughter of Guillaume Savalette (d. 1774), receiver general of the King's farms and noble citizen of the city of Perpignan and Marie-Agnès Dher (1712–1790).

At the age of 13, on 7 September 1748, in Perpignan, she married a man 18 years her senior, Jean-Baptiste-François de Durban, Gléon (1717-?), Marquis de Gléon, assistant minister at the embassy of Naples. She had several children, including Louise-Joseph-Étiennette, Joseph, Marie-Anne (1753), Gabrielle (1756) and Charles (1758).

In her youth, she was part of the court of the Prince of Conti.

Interested in the study of foreign languages, she worked to promote the ancient Spanish theatre. She introduced the French public to the work of William Shakespeare, notably by playing the role of Juliet in Romeo and Juliet. by François-Jean de Chastellux, the first French adaptation of the famous play by the English playwright.

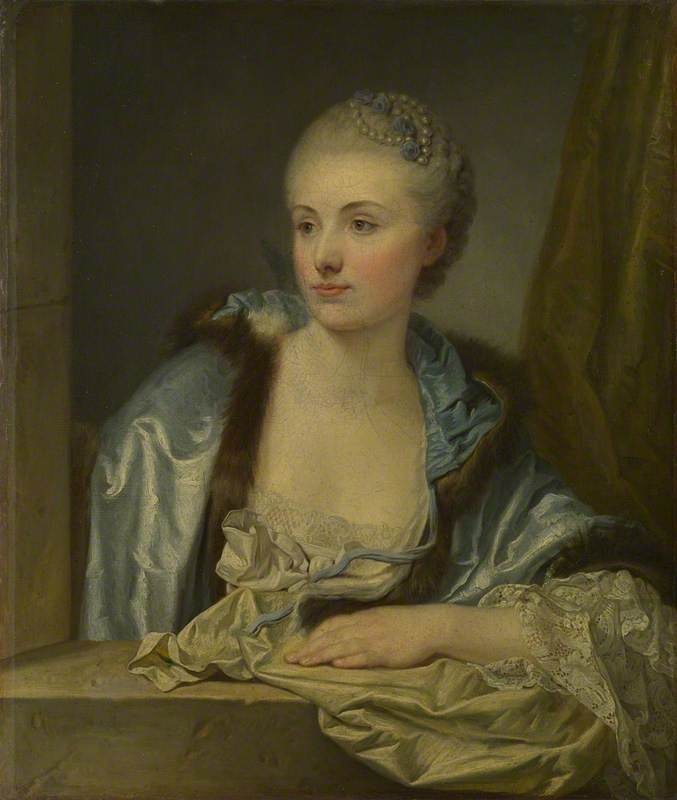
Portrait of a Lady (Madame de Gléon?), by Jean-Baptiste Greuze (ca. 1760)

She performed on numerous occasions in the theatre of Charles-Pierre Savalette de Magnanville, who rented the Château de la Chevrette from 1764 to 1780. In 1769, Louis Petit de Bachaumont, who attended an adaptation of Romeo and Juliet and Les Deux Orphelines by Savalette de Magnanville, wrote that "Madame la marquise de Gléon, who has the most charming face, combines a decent, easy and noble performance, and far surpasses the mannered tones and artificial allure of our best heroines in the theatre."

Barthes de Marmorières evokes, in a long poem in which he compares her to Thalia, her performances of Zaire and La Chercheuse d'esprit in Narbonne, around 1760.

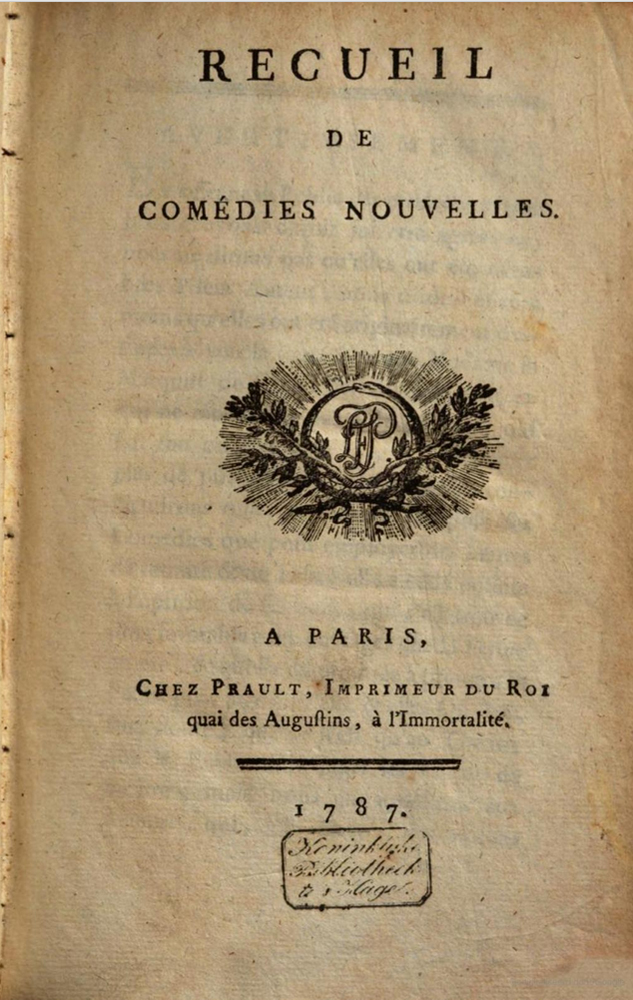
Recueil de comédies nouvelles

Following health problems, she devoted herself to mesmerism and wrote plays to relax. She left Paris for Hyères in the autumn of 1785 then settled in Marseille where she lived in 1786. Her play L'Ascendant de la vertu, ou la Paysanne philosophe was performed there in a public theatre. In 1787, this piece, as well as two others, La Fausse Sensibilité and Le Nouvelliste provincial appeared in her Recueil de comédies nouvelles published at the instigation of her friends.

Her 1774 self-portrait, a pastel, is held in the collection of the Museum of Fine Arts in Bernay.

== Death and legacy ==
During the French Revolution, she left France and died in exile in 1795 in Vicenza, Italy.

- Portrait of Madame la Marquise de Gléon, bust by Jean-Baptiste Lemoyne, exhibited at the 1765 Salon, described by Denis Diderot
- Madame la Marquise de Gléon, née Savalette, circa 1760, drawing by Louis Carrogis Carmontelle. Collection of the Musée Condé, Chantilly
- Portrait of a Lady (Madame de Gléon), oil on canvas by Jean-Baptiste Greuze. Collection of the National Gallery

== Selected works ==
=== As dramatist ===
- L'Américain
- L'Enlèvement, 1775
- Henriette, 1775

In 1787, she published Recueil de comédies nouvelles (Collection of new comedies) which included three other plays:

- L'Ascendant de la vertu, ou la Paysanne philosophe
- La Fausse Sensibilité
- Le Nouvelliste provincial
