= Genowefa =

Genowefa may refer to:

== Places ==
- Genowefa, Gmina Kleczew
- Genowefa, Gmina Krzymów

== People ==
- Genowefa Błaszak (born 1957), Polish track and field athlete
- Genowefa Grabowska (born 1944), Polish politician
- Genowefa Kobielska (1906–1993), Polish track and field athlete
- Genowefa Migas-Stawarz (born 1935), Polish fencer
- Genowefa Minicka (1926–1992), Polish sprinter
- Genowefa Patla (born 1962), Polish javelin thrower
- Genowefa Tokarska (born 1949), Polish politician
- Genowefa Wiśniowska (born 1949), Polish politician

== See also ==
- Genevieve (disambiguation)
- Genovefa
- Genoveffa
- Genoveva
- Genoveva (given name)
