= Sainte-Geneviève =

Saint Genevieve or Sainte-Geneviève may refer to:

- Saint Genevieve (419/422–512), the patron of Paris
- Saint Geneviève de Loqueffret (10th century), a local saint from Loqueffret, Brittany

== Buildings ==
- Bibliothèque Sainte-Geneviève, a library in the 5th arrondissement of Paris
- Abbey of St Genevieve, a French monastery in Paris, suppressed at the time of the French Revolution
- Panthéon, Paris, originally built as a church dedicated to Saint Geneviève

== Places ==
=== France ===
- Montagne Sainte-Geneviève, a hill on the left bank of the Seine in Paris
- Sainte-Geneviève, Aisne, in the Aisne department
- Sainte-Geneviève, Manche, in the Manche department
- Sainte-Geneviève, Meurthe-et-Moselle, in the Meurthe-et-Moselle department
- Sainte-Geneviève, Oise, in the Oise department
- Sainte-Geneviève, Seine-Maritime, in the Seine-Maritime department
- Sainte-Geneviève-des-Bois, Loiret, in the Loiret department
- Sainte-Geneviève-des-Bois, Essonne, in the Essonne department
- Sainte-Geneviève-lès-Gasny, in the Eure department
- Sainte-Geneviève-sur-Argence, in the Aveyron department

=== Canada ===
- Sainte-Geneviève, Quebec, a borough of Montreal
- Église Sainte-Geneviève, Montréal
- Ste-Geneviève, a community of the Rural Municipality of Taché, Manitoba
- Sainte-Geneviève-de-Batiscan, Quebec, in Les Chenaux Regional County Municipality
- Sainte-Geneviève-de-Berthier, Quebec, in D'Autray Regional County Municipality

=== United States ===
- Ste. Genevieve, Missouri
- Ste. Genevieve County, Missouri
