= Geneviève Vergez-Tricom =

French geographer (1889–1966)

Geneviève Vergez-Tricom (16 July 1889 – 7 December 1966) was a French geographer and historian. After a career in history, she specialized in geography, where she was one of the first French women to be teachers and publish in geographical publications. She developed the use of film to teach geography and her educational movies were widely distributed. Her work on Romania was awarded the Grand Prize of Geography of Ferdinand I of Romania.

== Biography ==
Geneviève Vergez-Tricom was born in Paris in 1889 and studied at Paris-Sorbonne where she obtained a bachelor's degree and a higher education diploma in 1923. She published numerous notes in the Annales de la géographie and, under the influence of Emmanuel de Martonne, moved into geomorphology with a noted and long-standing reference dissertation on the relief of the surroundings of Paris. From 1922 to 1926, she was responsible for practical work at the Sorbonne. Thanks to Emmanuel de Martonne, she was seconded from 1924 to 1927 as a teacher at the French Institute in Bucharest, Romania. The aim was then to develop De Martonne's research elsewhere, but the field of research was more complex than expected for the various followers. In 1928, she passed the male aggregation (higher-level competitive examinations for teachers and professors), which had been open to her since 1924. She was the first woman to be awarded a geography degree. She then became a high school teacher in Cherbourg, Tourcoing and Lille. From 1940 she taught preparatory classes at the Lycée Jules Ferry in Paris and then from 1955 at Lycée Camille-Sée, which made her a pioneer in this field.

== Works ==
Geneviève Vergez-Tricom began her publications in the field of history with a dissertation on "public spirit in the Rhône department since 1852, to the proclamation of the Empire." Under the influence of Albert Demangeon, she turned to geography with a study in 1917 on the market gardening belt of the Paris region, a so-called "feminine" study, in line with those proposed to Myriem Foncin. She did her fieldwork by bicycle to distribute her numerous questionnaires.

She published about many geographical subjects in the Annales de la géographie. She is, for example, the author of the third-decennial table, and “the magazine's most loyal and effective contributor,” Vergez-Tricom was among the first women to publish her research in geography journals, such as the Bulletin de l'Association des géographes français. She also published several history articles between 1920 and 1925 about the French Revolutions of 1848 and the country's Second Empire.

Vergez-Tricom began research for a thesis, under the supervision of Emmanuel de Martonne, whose field of study was Romania, but her work did not result in a doctorate. However, she wrote encyclopedic entries on Romanian cities. She was interested in the urban geography of Bucharest and published a study in 1927 with Robert Ficheux. This research in Transylvania and Banat was rewarded with a prize of 10,000 francs from the King Ferdinand I Foundation.

Vergez-Tricom was one of the first to use film as a teaching tool and became a pioneer in the field, with the creation of the magazine Film in 1936 and Cinéma Éducation. She was selected in 1935 to participate in the Congress of the Association for Photographic and Cinematographic Documentation in the Sciences and the Salon de la Cinématographie. Her films were regularly screened, including at the Venice Biennale.

She died 7 December 1966 in Yzeure, France. She had asked that scientific journals not publish a notice of her death, which is customary for prominent contributors such as Vergez-Tricom.

== Selected works ==
=== Films ===
- Le Travail des eaux courantes (The Work of Flowing Water) (1952) - Geneviève Vergez-Tricom [Extract]
- La Montagne
- Trader-Horn
- Le Bassin parisien

=== Articles ===
- Vergez-Tricom, Geneviève. "Les évènements de décembre 1851 à Lyon." Revue d'Histoire du XIXe siècle-1848 17, no. 86 (1920): 226–253.
- Vergez-Tricom, Geneviève. "La culture du coton aux États-Unis." In Annales de Géographie, vol. 32, no. 180, pp. 560–563. Armand Colin, 1923.
- Vergez-Tricom, Geneviève. "Le pétrole en Roumanie." In Annales de géographie, vol. 32, no. 177, pp. 281–284. Société de géographie, 1923.
- Vergez-Tricom, Geneviève. "Le relief des environs de Paris (spécialement au Sud de la Seine)." In Annales de Géographie, vol. 33, no. 186, pp. 523–542. Armand Colin, 1924.
- Vergez-Tricom, Geneviève, and Robert Ficheux. "Bucarest." In Annales de géographie, vol. 36, no. 201, pp. 213–231. Armand Colin, 1927.
