= Genoveffa =

Genoveffa is a female given name. Notable people with the name include:

- Genoveffa of Brabant, of medieval legend
- Genoveffa Franchini, Italian-American hematologist and retrovirologist
- Genoveffa Sens, a.k.a. Gina Cigna (1900–2001), French-Italian operatic soprano

== See also ==
- Genevieve (given name)
- Genovefa
- Genoveva (given name)
- Genowefa (disambiguation)
