= Marie-Bénédicte Poton =

Marie-Bénédicte Poton or Mme. Huet (died 1789) was a French perfumer. She was royal purveyor and supplier of perfume and cosmetics to the French royal family in 1754–1767.

== Life and career ==
In 1735 she married the Parisian perfumer François Huet the younger, official supplier, or marchande gantière-parfumeuse privilégiée suivant la cour ("priviliged official supplier of cloves and perfumes of the royal court"). Her husband owned an exclusive luxury shop in Paris and belonged to a family who had the privilege to manufacture and supply the royal family and court with perfume, cloves, fans and different cosmetics such as powder.

When she was widowed in 1754, she inherited the business and office of her late spouse. In 1767 she married for a second time to the twenty years younger perfumer Claude-François Prévost. After the wedding, her second husband was appointed marchand parfumeur du roi et de la reine ("perfume merchant of the king and queen").

She died in Paris in 1789.
