= Genevieve M. Walton =

American librarian

Genevieve Maria Julia Walton
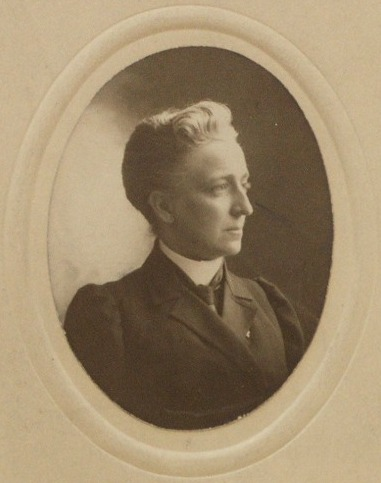
- Born: June 25, 1857; Ypsilanti, Michigan, US
- Died: April 25, 1932 (aged 74); Ypsilanti, Michigan, US
- Occupation: Librarian

Genevieve Walton (1857–1932) was an American librarian who was head librarian at Eastern Michigan University from 1892 to 1932. Walton was also a member of a variety of different library associations across Michigan.

== Early life ==
Walton was born in Ypsilanti, Michigan on June 25, 1857, and was educated at Saint Mary's College in Indiana. Walton also studied painting with the Art Student's League and George Inness' Studio in New York, before spending a year in Italy to further her studies. She was beginning to have trouble with her eyes and, in 1892, began her work as a librarian.

== At Eastern Michigan University ==
When Walton began working as the head librarian for Eastern Michigan University, then called the Michigan Normal College, the University's library was a one-person one-room operation that Walton worked to transform into a higher-education library. After she was appointed, Walton received professional training in the form of a six-week course through the Fletcher School in Amherst, MA. She would later receive a Master of the Arts from Saint Mary's. Walton was also a strong believer that librarians were also educators and during her first at the University Library she began a lecture series designed to teach students how to use their library. Over time, circulation at the library began to increase until a new library building was constructed on campus. Walton served as head librarian at Michigan Normal College until a few months before her death on April 25, 1932. After Walton died, J.A.S. wrote an In Memoriam poem that was published in The Normal College News.

== Walton's influence ==
Walton was heavily involved in a variety of library societies across Michigan: she was a member, founder and two-time president of the Michigan Library Association and a member of the American Library Association, the National Education Association, the Michigan Schoolmates Club, and the Ladies Library Association of the City of Ypsilanti. Throughout her work with these various organizations, Walton always emphasized the role of libraries and librarians in Education. In 1908 she wrote Grade Room Libraries and frequently wrote articles for professional library journals and American Schoolmaster magazine. Furthermore, she also had a significant role in the development of Michigan's libraries and published Libraries in Michigan: A Historical Sketch in 1926. Finally, In 1925, she spoke at commencement for the Library School of the New York Public Library. This address, called "The Lost Librarian" emphasized Walton's love for reading and in 1930, the college dedicated their annual, called Aurora, to Walton. In 1967, the college constructed and named a residence hall after Walton-it will officially close at the end of the winter 2022 semester.
