= Paris-Sorbonne University =

Former French university existing from 1971 to 2018

- Université Paris-Sorbonne (Paris IV)
- Type: Public
- Active: 1 January 1971–31 December 2017
- Academic affiliations: Sorbonne University group
- Budget: €118,800,000
- President: Barthélémy Jobert
- Academic staff: 1,300
- Administrative staff: 774
- Students: 23,505
- Undergraduates: 13,900
- Postgraduates: 6,916
- Doctoral students: 2,508
- Location: Paris, France; 48°50′55″N 2°20′34″E
- Campus: 12 urban campuses
- Newspaper: Presses de l'Université Paris-Sorbonne
- Colours: Indigo & gold
- Nickname: Paris IV
- Sporting affiliations: Association Sportive de Paris IV
- Website: www.sorbonne-universite.fr
- Location in Paris

Paris-Sorbonne University (also known as Paris IV; French: Université Paris-Sorbonne, Paris IV) was a public research university in Paris, France, active from 1971 to 2017. It was the main inheritor of the Faculty of Humanities of the University of Paris. In 2018, it merged with Pierre and Marie Curie University to form the new Sorbonne University and became its Faculty of Arts and Humanities.

== History ==
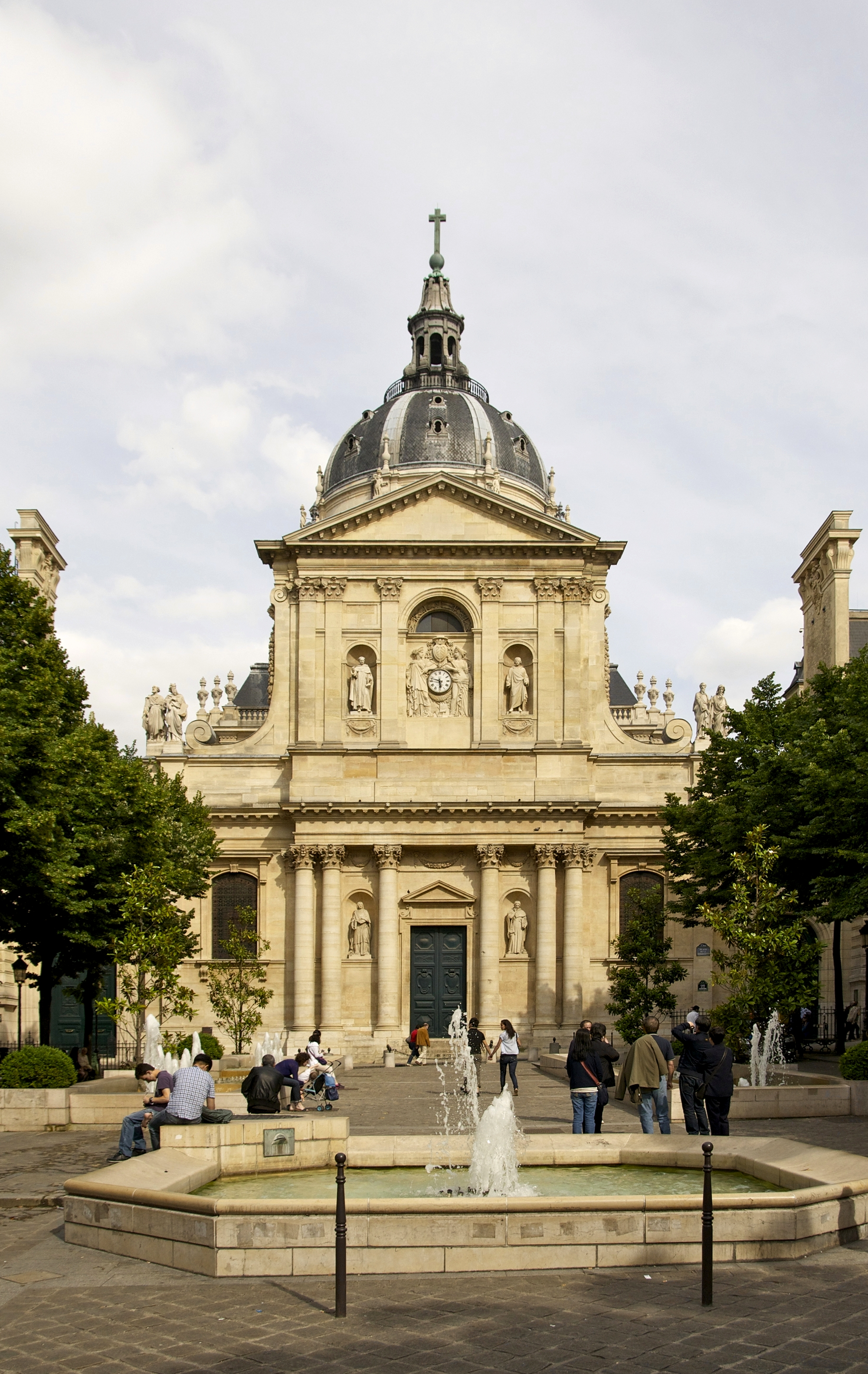
Sorbonne in the Latin Quarter in Paris, France. Historical house of the former University of Paris, and main university building of its successor Paris-Sorbonne University 1971–2017.

Paris-Sorbonne University was one of the inheritors of the Faculty of Humanities (French: Faculté des lettres) of the University of Paris (also known as the Sorbonne), which ceased to exist following student protests in May 1968. The Faculty of Humanities was the main focus of the University of Paris, and subsequently Paris-Sorbonne University was one of its main successors. It was a member of the Sorbonne University Group.

Paris-Sorbonne University enrolled about 24,000 students in 20 departments specialising in arts, humanities and languages, divided in 12 campuses throughout Paris. Seven of the campuses were situated in the historic Latin Quarter, including the historic Sorbonne university building, and three in the Marais, Malesherbes and Clignancourt respectively. In addition, the university also maintained one campus in Abu Dhabi, United Arab Emirates, called Sorbonne University Abu Dhabi. Paris-Sorbonne University also comprised France's prestigious communication and journalism school, CELSA, located in the Parisian suburb of Neuilly-sur-Seine. Paris-Sorbonne University maintained about 400 international agreements.

As a successor of the faculty of humanities of the University of Paris, it was a founding member the Sorbonne University group, an alliance with the successor of the faculty of law and economics and of the faculty of science of the University of Paris (respectively, Panthéon-Assas University and Pierre-and-Marie-Curie University). This group allowed Paris-Sorbonne University students to pursue several dual degrees. Two graduate certificates in law from Panthéon-Assas University (Sorbonne Law School) were accessible for all the student members of the Sorbonne University group.

== Succession: Sorbonne University ==
On 1 January 2018, Paris-Sorbonne University merged with Pierre-and-Marie-Curie University to create the Sorbonne University.

== Notable people ==
=== Notable faculty and staff ===
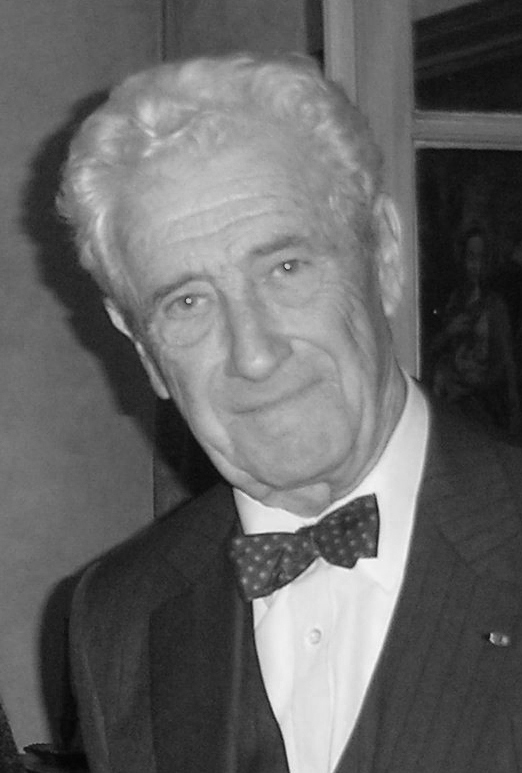
Jean Favier (1932–2014), French historian, director of the French National Archives, and president of the Bibliothèque nationale de France.

Notable Paris-Sorbonne university faculty include:

- Dominique Barbéris, novelist, French literature
- Yves-Marie Bercé, historian, member of the Académie des sciences morales et politiques (2007)
- Philippe Contamine, historian, member of the Académie des inscriptions et belles-lettres
- Denis Crouzet, historian, awarded the Madeleine Laurain-Portemer prize by the Académie des Sciences Morales et Politiques
- Marc Fumaroli, member of the Académie française, professor at the Collège de France
- Jean Favier (1932–2014), historian, member of the Académie des Inscriptions et Belles-Lettres
- Nicolas Grimal, egyptologist, member of the Académie des Inscriptions et Belles-Lettres
- Claude Lecouteux, historian
- Jean-Luc Marion, philosopher, member of the Académie française (2008)
- Danièle Pistone, musicologist, correspondent member at the Académie des beaux-arts (2014)
- Frédéric Regard, littérature britannique, spécialiste des études de genre en France
- Jean-Yves Tadié, English Literature
- Jean Tulard, historian, member of the Académie des sciences morales et politiques (1994)

=== Notable alumni ===
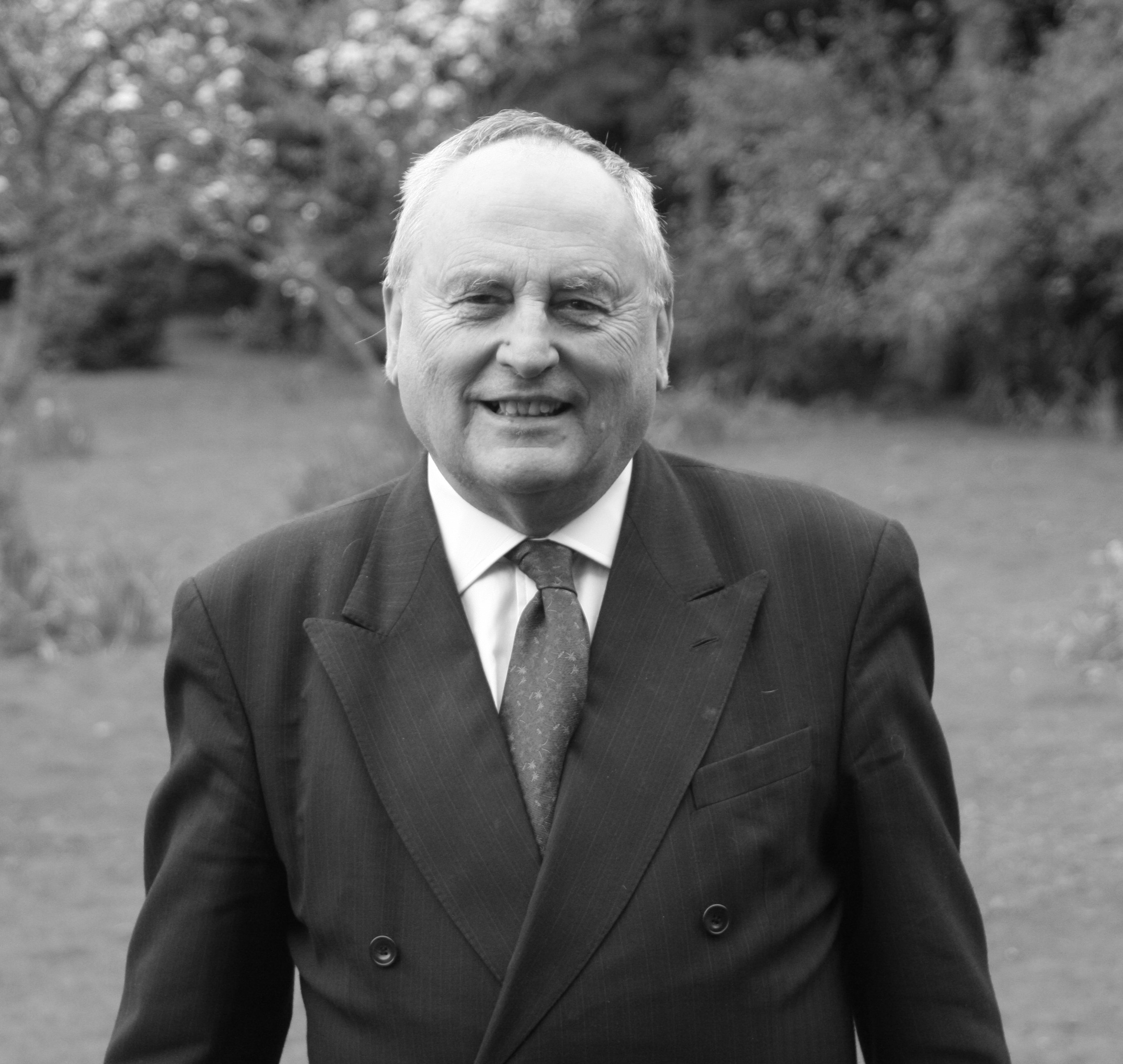
Donald Adamson (1939–2024), British literary scholar, author and historian.

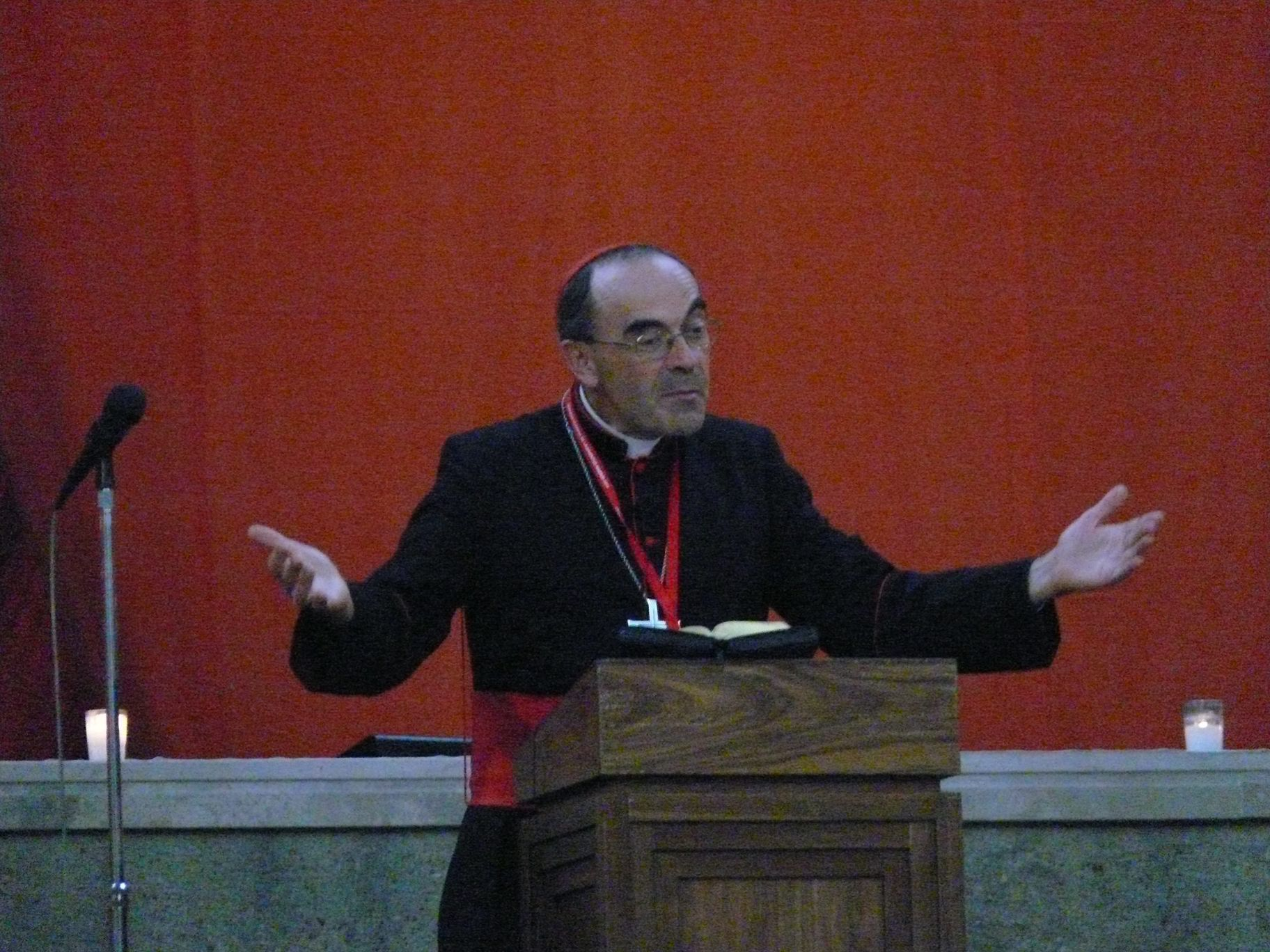
Philippe Barbarin (born 1950), French Catholic Archbishop of Lyon and cardinal.

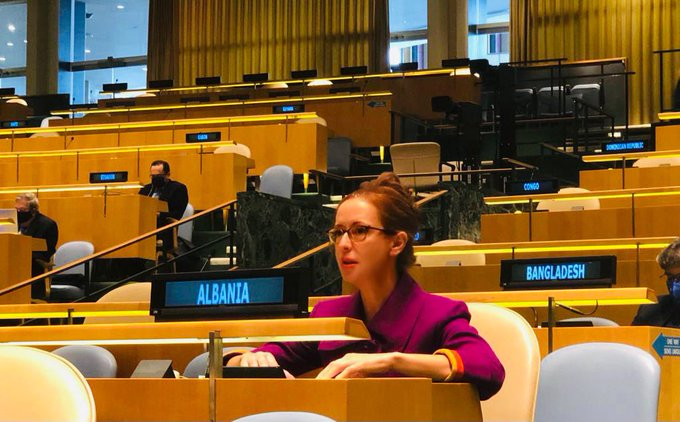
Ambassador Besiana Kadare in the UN General Assembly Hall

- Donald Adamson (1939–2024), British historian
- Tania Velmans French art historian (1938 – 2022)
- Shmuel Agmon (1922-2025), Israeli mathematician
- Hamad Bin Abdulaziz Al-Kawari (born 1948), Qatari diplomat
- Sophia Antoniadis (1895–1972), classical scholar and first female professor at Leiden University
- Soheir Bakhoum (1947-2003), curator and numismatist
- Philippe Barbarin (born 1950), French Catholic Archbishop of Lyon and cardinal
- Charlotte Casiraghi (born 1986), Italian fashion journalist
- Karl P. Cohen (1913–2012), American physical chemist
- Ioan Petru Culianu (1950–1991), Romanian historian
- Abiol Lual Deng (born 1983), South Sudanese-American political scientist
- Mamadou Diouf, Senegalese professor of Western African history at Columbia University
- Marie Drucker (born 1974), French journalist
- Soudabeh Fazaeli (born 1947), Iranian seismologist, researcher, mythologist and writer
- Luc Ferry (born 1951), French philosopher
- Henri Guaino (born 1957) French politician
- William Irigoyen (born 1970), French journalist
- Besiana Kadare (born 1972), Albanian Ambassador to the UN
- Samir Kassir (1960–2005), Lebanese-French professor of history at Saint-Joseph University
- Jiddu Krishnamurti (born 1895), Indian philosopher
- Thanh Hai Ngo (born 1947), Vietnamese-Canadian senator
- Caterina Magni (born 1966) Italian-French archaeologist
- Shahrzad Rafati (born 1980), Iranian-Canadian media entrepreneur
- Bernard Romain (born 1944), French painter and sculptor
- Christiane Taubira (born 1952), Minister of Justice of France
- Habib Tawa (born 1945), Lebanese-French historian
- Jean-Pierre Thiollet (born 1956), French writer
- Shunichi Yamaguchi (born 1950), Japanese politician
- Nureldin Satti, Sudanese diplomat and ambassador to the United States.
- Geneviève Vergez-Tricom (1889-1966), French geographer, historian
- Jemima West (born 1987), Anglo-French actress
- Baby Varghese, Indian scholar and professor
- Zahia Ziouani (born 1978), French composer

== See also ==
- Sorbonne University, its successor
- University of Paris, its predecessor
- Sorbonne
- Education in France
