= Genoveva Virginia Cossoul =

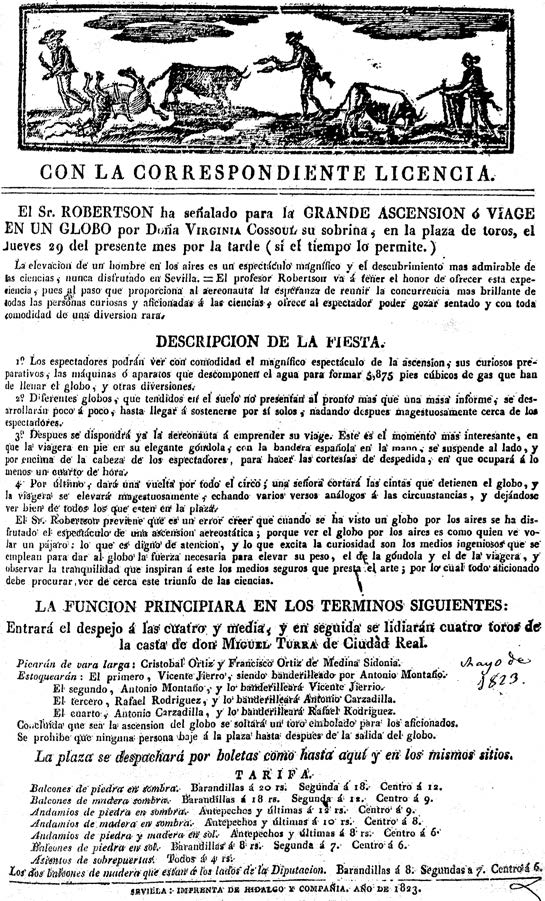
- poster advertising Cossoul's May 1823 balloon ascent
- Born: 18 April 1800; Paris
- Died: 28 February 1879 (aged 78)
- Occupation: Composer, balloonist
- Spouse(s): Jean Louis Olivier Cossoul
- Children: Guilherme Cossoul, Sophie Cossoul

Genoveva Virginia Cossoul (18 April 1800 – 28 February 1879) was a Portuguese harpist, composer, and aeronaut.

Maria Genoveva Virginia Tomassu was born on 18 April 1800 in Paris. She was the niece of stage magician and aeronaut Étienne-Gaspard Robert and toured with him and his son Eugene as an assistant. She ascended in a balloon in a celebrated May 1823 performance in Seville.

In 1820, she married another one of Robert's assistants, musician and composer Jean Louis Olivier Cossoul. While they continued to work and tour with Roberts, they eventually settled in Portugal permanently. Their children Ricardo Cossoul, Sophia Cossoul, and Guilherme Cossoul also became musicians. She opened a music school called Pensionai Français in Lisbon near the Palace of the Marquis of Pombal where her students included Augusto Neuparth and Eugénio Mazoni.

Genoveva Virginia Cossoul died on 28 February 1879.
