= Genevieve Fallon Steefel =

American civic leader

- Fallon, from the 1923 yearbook of Radcliffe College
- Born: Genevieve Rose Fallon; November 11, 1899; Massachusetts, U.S.
- Died: October 20, 1971 (aged 71); Minneapolis, Minnesota, U.S.
- Occupation: Civic leader

Genevieve Rose Fallon Steefel (November 11, 1899 – October 20, 1971) was an American civic leader, described as "one of Minnesota's most distinguished citizens." She worked on the presidential campaign of Henry A. Wallace and took particular interest in mental health reform, education, and racial equality.

== Early life and education ==
Fallon was born in Cambridge, Massachusetts, the daughter of Christopher Henry Fallon and Gertrude Evangeline Braslin Fallon. Her father died in 1906, and her mother worked in a factory; the widowed Gertrude Braslin Fallon was institutionalized at Worcester State Hospital while her daughters were young.

Fallon attended Simmons College and graduated from Radcliffe College in 1923; at Radcliffe she was president of the debating club.

== Career ==
Steefel moved to Minneapolis after college, because her husband was a professor at the University of Minnesota. In the 1930s and 1940s she was president of the Minnesota chapter of the American Association of University Women (AAUW).

During World War II, Steefel was involved with the Twin Cities Japanese American Citizens League, helping Japanese-Americans find work in Minnesota after incarceration. She worked on the presidential campaign of Henry A. Wallace in 1948, and was urged to seek elected office herself, but she firmly declined such suggestions.

Steefel was secretary of the Minnesota Unitarian committee on mental hospitals. She worked with other Unitarians, and governor Luther Youngdahl, to reform institutional care in Minnesota.

Steefel served on the national board of the American Council on Human Relations. In 1952 she became the first woman to chair the Mayor's Committee for Human Relations in Minneapolis. Also in 1952, she received the Percy Villa Boys' Club Award for her work toward "sound human relations and the brotherhood of mankind." Eleanor Roosevelt mentioned hearing Steefel speak in New York, in a 1953 "My Day" column. She was a leader of the United Nations Association in Minnesota.

== Personal life and legacy ==
Fallon married historian Lawrence D. Steefel in 1925. They had two children, Lawrence and Nina. Steefel died in 1971, at the age of 71, in Minneapolis. There are collections of her papers at the Minnesota Historical Society and in the Library of Congress.
