= San Andrés (Mesoamerican site) =

Olmec archaeological site in the present-day Mexican state of Tabasco

A rollout of the San Andrés cylinder seal, showing the bird possibly "speaking" the name "3 Ajaw"

San Andrés is an Olmec archaeological site in the present-day Mexican state of Tabasco. Located 5 km (3 miles) northeast of the Olmec ceremonial center of La Venta in the Grijalva river delta section of the Tabasco Coastal Plain, San Andrés is considered one of its elite satellite communities, with evidence of elite residences and other elite activities. Several important archaeological finds have been made at San Andrés, including the oldest evidence of the domesticated sunflower, insight into Olmec feasting rituals, didactic miniatures, and possible evidence of an Olmec writing system.

Mary Pohl, funded by The Foundation for the Advancement of Mesoamerican Studies, has been a crucial part of conducting ceramic analysis and collecting evidence of feasting vessels and early Olmec writing on greenstone plaques and ceramic roller stamps.

== Overview ==
The earliest evidence of human activity at San Andrés – maize (Zea species) pollen and extensive charcoal deposits from swidden (slash-and-burn) agriculture – has been dated to 5300 BCE. At that time, the Gulf of Mexico was further inland and San Andrés was the site of beach ridges and barrier lagoons, features that are today some 15 km to the north.

Later evidence of human habitation includes pollen dated to 4600 BCE, seeds from 2600 BCE, and evidence of maize cultivation from 2000 BCE.

San Andrés and La Venta in the context of the Olmec heartland

The first evidence of Olmec occupation has been dated to 1350 BCE, an occupation that lasted some 150 years (until 1200 BCE), with an ensuing hiatus lasting until roughly 900 BCE. Continuously occupied over the following 550 years, San Andrés was finally abandoned some time before 350 BCE. This date roughly coincides with the abandonment of the La Venta and the dissolution of the Olmec culture.

== Early traces of domesticated plants ==
San Andrés is notable for the ancient pollen and seeds recovered there. Although the humid rainy tropical lowlands have made quick work of organic substances, including Olmec skeletal remains, the multi-disciplinary research team delved below the water table, hoping that the preservative nature of water-logged soil would enable them to retrieve ancient samples.

Their findings include:

- Early maize (Zea species) pollen from as early as 5100 BCE.
- A single manioc pollen grain dated to roughly 4600 BCE. Since manioc pollen is rare in sediments, its discovery was either "fortuitous, or abundant stands of manioc were growing close to the site".
- A domesticated sunflower seed and fruit dated to roughly 2650 BCE and 2550 BCE respectively. This is the earliest record yet of the domesticated sunflower.
- Cotton (Gossypium) pollen from roughly 2500 BCE. The researchers suggest that this cotton was domesticated, although wild cotton does occur naturally along the Gulf Coast to the east.

== Evidence of elites' feasting ==
"In Formative period Mesoamerica, high-status goods were significant components of cultural practice and a source of social, political, and ideological power." Seinfeld (2007) asserts that “early complex societies often used feasting as a way for individuals to gain followers and to assert their status” and that this occurred at San Andres. This study is particularly interesting because the researchers used sound and updated methods to determine social facts concerning feasting at a site where little is conclusively known about social structures. Maize and cacao were detected due to their distinctive biomarkers including C4 signature plant carbon for maize and nitrogen containing organic compounds for cacao. "Discoveries include patterns of maize use suggestive of its use as an elite feasting food and beverage rather than as a dietary staple. Further results suggest possible evidence of Olmec cacao use." During the Middle Formative period feasting allowed the elite to demonstrate their power and enhance their status and identity, as the consumption of alcohol had ritualistic and spiritual meaning among the elites. Cocoa, maize-alcohol, and "elite-foods" gave these gatherings special significance and provides definite proof that there was an elite class in San Andres, and, by extension, La Venta.

== Didactic miniatures ==
Pohl (2005) and her colleagues found plenty of evidence to suggest that miniature representations of everyday objects were used ritualistically. "These miniatures may have been crafted with the express purpose of composing didactic or ritual reenactments of crucial mythic or conventionalized historic events much in the same fashion as La Venta Offering 4." Other elite-religious-status denoting objects (greenstone artifacts, jewelry, maskettes, iron-ore mirrors, etc.) were found at San Andres. "A contextual comparison suggests that, like the La Venta prestige artifacts, the San Andrés sumptuary items were significant components of ceremonial activity."

== Indications of an Olmec writing system ==
San Andrés glyphs. The top set of glyphs have been interpreted as "3 Ajaw". The bottom two glyphs were found incised into semi-precious greenstone artifacts.

Excavations at San Andrés in 1997 and 1998 produced three artifacts that many archaeologists contend demonstrate that the Olmec civilization used a true writing system. These artifacts, dated roughly to 650 BCE (the middle of the Olmec concentration at La Venta and San Andres), were found in a refuse dump, the remains from a festival or feast. “The fact that the artifacts with glyphs were found in the context of feasting refuse suggest that writing among the Olmec was sacred and was closely tied to ritual activities.”

The most important find was a fist-sized ceramic cylinder seal, likely used to print cloth. When rolled out, the seal shows two speech scrolls emanating from a bird, followed directly by a number of design elements enframing what has been interpreted as logograms for “king (sideways U shape),” "3 (three dots, according to the Mesoamerican bar and dots numbering system),” and “Ajaw (from the sacred 260-day calendar)", a designation used for both a calendar date and, in keeping with Mesoamerican custom, the name of an Olmec ruler. In addition to the ceramic cylinder seal, two fingernail-sized fragments from a greenstone plaque have been recovered, each containing an incised glyph. Both these glyphs have been linked to well-documented glyphs in other Mesoamerican writing systems, including the Isthmian and Maya scripts.

== See also ==
- El Manatí - an Olmec archaeological site where, like San Andrés, water-logged soil also preserved organic artifacts
