= List of hot drinks =

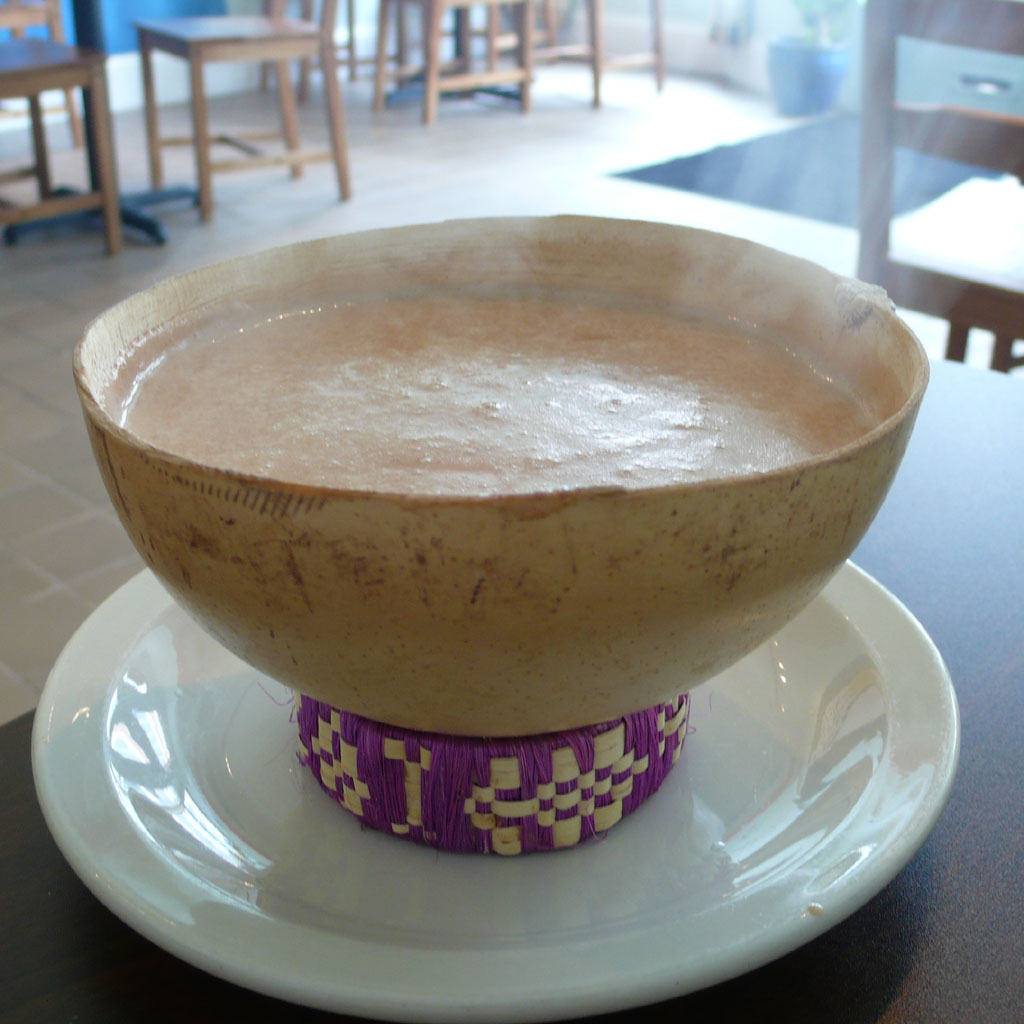
A hot bowl of champurrado as served at a Mexican breakfast

This list of hot drinks comprises drinks that are typically served hot. Drinks are liquids specifically prepared for human consumption.

== Hot drinks ==
Name	Image	Origin	Description
Aleberry			Made by boiling ale with spice (such as nutmeg), sugar and bread-sops, the last commonly toasted. It is sweetened, strained, and drunk hot.
Anijsmelk			Dutch drink, consisting of hot milk flavored with anise seed and sweetened with sugar
Apple cider			Popular fall (autumn) and winter beverage: Wassail – a hot mulled cider traditionally drunk as an integral part of wassailing, an ancient southern English drinking ritual intended to ensure a good cider apple harvest the following year; Wassail: Heißer Apfelwein – hot apfelwein mixed with spices used typical in Glühwein (mulled wine) like cinnamon, orange, clove, lemon peel and slowly heated up. Traditional winter drink in south Hesse, Germany.
Asiático			Popular hot drink from Cartagena, Spain, consisting of coffee with condensed milk and cognac.
Atole			Traditional masa-based hot corn based beverage of Mexican and Central American origin, where it is known as atol: Champurrado – a chocolate-based atole
Bajigur			Hot and sweet beverage native to the Sundanese people of West Java, Indonesia. The main ingredients are coconut milk and Aren palm sugar; usually to add taste, a small amount of ginger and a small pinch of salt.
Bandrek		West Java, Indonesia	Traditional hot, sweet and spicy beverage native to Sundanese people of West Java, Indonesia. It's a mixture of jahe (ginger) essence, gula merah (palm sugar) and kayu manis (cinnamon).
Blackberry demitasse			Cocktail made from blackberry brandy or liqueur, blackberry jelly, cognac, water and lemon juice. It is served hot in a demitasse with a slice of lemon.
Blue Blazer			Flaming cocktail made from Scotch or Irish Whiskey, honey, boiling water and lemon peel. It is served steaming hot for slow sipping.
Bouillon			Includes clam, tomato, oyster, chicken, asparagus bouillon and others, served at soda fountains in the United States in the early 1900s. Food extracts such as beef extract were also used to prepare beef-flavored drinks add flavoring to other drinks at U.S. soda fountains during this time. The beef variety was sometimes referred to as "beef tea". Olives were often used in these bouillon drinks and those that were salty.: Consommé – A concentrated and clarified form of bouillon; Poultry consommé
Butter tea		Tibet	Also known as po cha, a drink of Tibet, Nepal, Bhutan, and Buddhist minorities in India, made from tea leaves, yak butter, water, and salt. Drinking butter tea is a regular part of Tibetan life. Before work, a Tibetan will typically enjoy several bowlfuls of this beverage, and it is always served to guests. Nomads are said to often drink up to 40 cups of it a day. Since butter is the main ingredient, the drink provides plenty of caloric energy and is particularly suited to high altitudes. The butter may also help prevent chapped lips.
Cannabis tea			A cannabis-infused drink prepared by steeping various parts of the cannabis plant in hot or cold water.
Caudle			British thickened and sweetened alcoholic hot drink, somewhat like eggnog. It was popular in the Middle Ages for its supposed medicinal properties.
Coffee			There are several accounts of the historical origin of coffee.: For various types of coffee beverages, see List of coffee beverages
Hot egg drinks			Phosphate soda and beverages were made with fruit flavorings, egg, malt, or wine. They became popular among men in the 1870s in the United States, and in the 1900s, the beverages became popular with both men and women. Fruit-flavoured phosphate sodas were served at soda fountains, before losing popularity to ice cream beverages in the 1930s.: Hot egg phosphate; Egg nog
Espresso			Coffee brewed by forcing a small amount of nearly boiling water under pressure through finely ground coffee beans. Angelo Moriondo's Italian patent for a steam-driven "instantaneous" coffee beverage making device, which was registered in Turin in 1884 (No. 33/256), is notable. Author Ian Bersten, whose history of coffee brewers is cited below, claims to have been the first to discover Moriondo's patent. Bersten describes the device as "... almost certainly the first Italian bar machine that controlled the supply of steam and water separately through the coffee" and Moriondo as "... certainly one of the earliest discoverers of the expresso [sic] machine, if not the earliest." The term espresso, substituting s for most x letters in Latin-root words, with the term deriving from the past participle of the Italian verb esprimere, itself derived from the Latin exprimere, means 'to express', and refers to the process by which hot water is forced under pressure through ground coffee. Types of espresso drinks include: Bicerin; Caffè crema; Cuban espresso; Espressino; Lungo; Marocchino; Mocaccino – also called caffè mocha; Bicerin Cuban espresso Lungo Mocaccino
Hot ginger cordial			Served at U.S. soda fountains in the early 1900s
Greyana rakiya			Boiled rakiya; a winter alcoholic beverage in Bulgarian cuisine prepared with grape or plum brandy and honey
Grog			Refers to a variety of alcoholic beverages. Modern versions are often made with hot or boiling water, and sometimes include lemon juice, lime juice, cinnamon or sugar to improve the taste. Rum with water, sugar, and nutmeg was known as bumbo and was more popular with pirates and merchantmen.
Herbal tea			Any beverage made from the infusion or decoction of herbs, spices, or other plant material in hot water, and usually does not contain caffeine. These drinks are distinguished from true teas that are prepared from the cured leaves of the tea plant, Camellia sinensis.
Hot buttered rum			Mixed drink containing rum, butter, hot water or cider, a sweetener, and various spices, usually cinnamon, nutmeg, and cloves
Hot chocolate			Also known as hot cocoa, it typically consists of shaved chocolate, melted chocolate or cocoa powder, heated milk or water, and sugar. Hot egg chocolate is a type of hot chocolate.
Hot toddy		United Kingdom	Mixed drink made of liquor and water with sugar and spices and served hot.
Irish coffee			Cocktail consisting of hot coffee, sugar and Irish whiskey, topped with thick cream
Hot lemonade			Claret lemonade is a type of hot lemonade
Yulmu-cha			In Korea, a thick drink called yulmu cha (율무차, literally "Job's tears tea") is made from powdered Job's tears.
Malted milk			Powdered gruel made from a mixture of malted barley, wheat flour, and whole milk, which is evaporated until it forms a powder. Brands of malted milk include: Horlicks – the name of a malted milk hot drink and company. In 1883, U.S. patent 278,967 was granted to William Horlick for the first malted milk drink mixing powder prepared with hot water; Milo – a chocolate and malt powder which is mixed with hot or cold water or milk to produce a beverage popular in many parts of the world; Ovaltine – a brand of milk flavoring product usually made with malt extract. It was developed in Berne, Switzerland, where it is known by its original name, Ovomaltine (from ovum, Latin for "egg", and malt, which were originally its main ingredients).; Milo
Mate cocido			Infusion typical of Southern Cone cuisine (mostly consumed in Southern Brazil, Argentina, Paraguay and Uruguay). It is traditionally prepared by boiling yerba mate in water, then strained and served in cups.
Mulled wine			Usually made with red wine along with various mulling spices and raisins. Wine was first recorded as spiced and heated in 1st century Rome.: Greyano Vino – a winter alcoholic beverage in Bulgarian cuisine
Posset			British hot drink of milk curdled with wine or ale, often spiced, which was popular from medieval times to the 19th century. It was typically prepared with milk that was heated to a boil, then mixed with wine or ale, which curdled it, and the mixture was usually spiced.
Postum			Roasted grain beverage that was popular as a coffee substitute during World War II.
Rüdesheimer Kaffee			Alcoholic coffee drink from Rüdesheim am Rhein in Germany invented in 1957 by the German television chef, Hans Karl Adam.
Sake			Traditional Japanese beverage which is produced from fermented rice and may be served hot
Salep			Turkish beverage made of tubers of some Orchid species. Also known as sahlep. Served with cinnamon and sometimes mahlep.
Sassafras tea			Tastes much like root beer but was traditionally drank hot or cold in the southern United States.
Smoking bishop			Type of mulled wine punch or wassail that was especially popular in Victorian England at Christmas time
Soda			Historically, hot sodas were served at soda fountains. In the early 1960s, Dr Pepper promoted the idea of serving the drink hot with lemon slices in winter.
Spiced punch			Spiced punch served hot
Tea			The exact inventor of tea is unknown, but Chinese legends attribute the invention of tea to Shennong in 2737 BC. Pictured is a cup of Earl Grey black tea.: Chai tea – heavily-spiced tea originating from India; Green tea – made from the leaves from Camellia sinensis that have undergone minimal oxidation during processing. It originated in China, but has become associated with many cultures throughout Asia.; Teh talua – tea beverage from West Sumatra that uses egg yolk in its preparation; Russian tea – popular holiday beverage particularly in the Southeastern United States; See also: List of Chinese teas; Masala chai/masala tea Green tea leaves steeping in a gaiwan
Wedang Jahe		Indonesia	An Indonesian ginger tea

=== India ===
There are many hot beverages that originated from India that have gained popularity in other countries. For example, chai (also known as masala chai) is a spiced milk tea that has become very popular throughout the world. Coffee also became a popular hot beverage in India, especially filtered coffee.

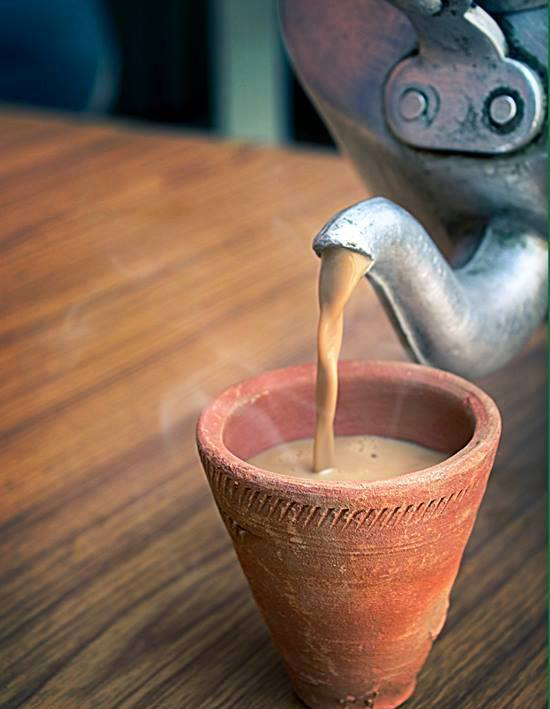
Masala chai

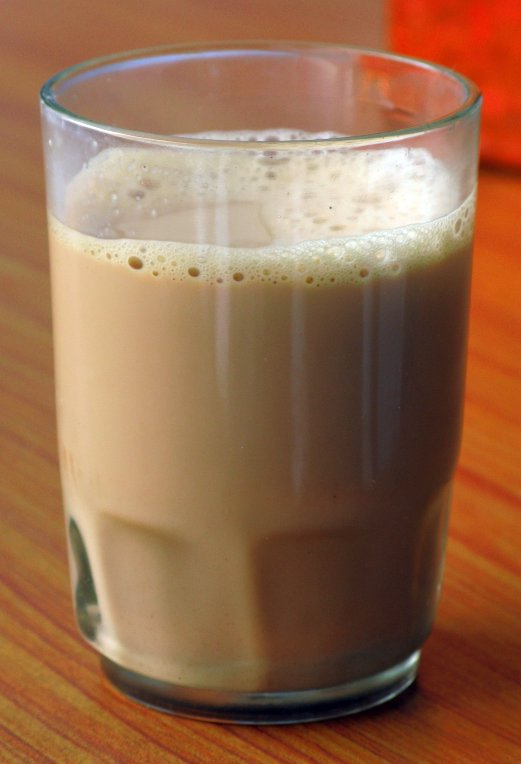
Indian tea

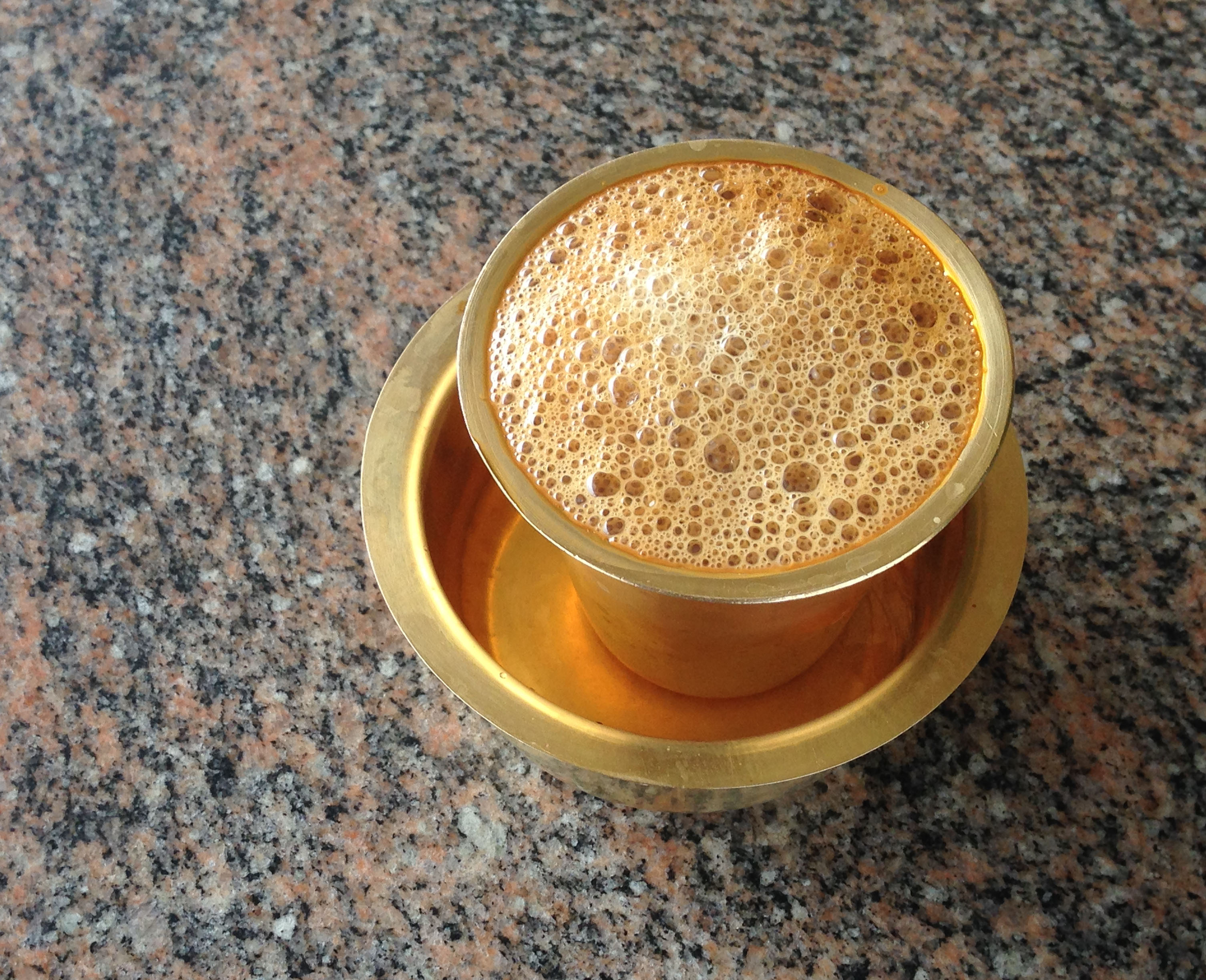
South Indian filter coffee

== See also ==
- Coffee culture
- Coffeehouse
- Coffee service
- Drinking
- International Coffee Day
- Tea culture
- Tea house
- List of beverages – categorically organized article along with information about primary topics and list article links
- List of Chinese teas
- List of chocolate beverages
- List of coffee beverages
- Lists of beverages – index of beverage list articles on Wikipedia

== Bibliography ==
- Constance B. Hieatt; Eulalia Pensado (1988). An Ordinance of pottage: an edition of the fifteenth century culinary recipes in Yale University's Ms Beinecke 163. Prospect Books and Beinecke Rare Book and Manuscript Library. ISBN 978-0-907325-38-3.
