= Bumbu (disambiguation) =

Bumbu may refer to:

- Bumbu, a municipality in the Funa district in the province Kinshasa, the capital city of the Democratic Republic of the Congo
- Tanah Bumbu Regency, a regency in the Indonesian province of South Kalimantan
- Bumbu (seasoning), the word for spice or seasoning in Indonesian cuisine
- Bumbo, a drink made from rum, water, sugar, and nutmeg, also known as bumbu.
- Bumbu rum is also a brand of rum produced by the West Indies Rum Distillery
- Iulian Bumbu, the designer of the Lamborghini Insecta
- Ioan Gruia Bumbu, the president of the National Agency for the Roma
