= Romani CRISS =

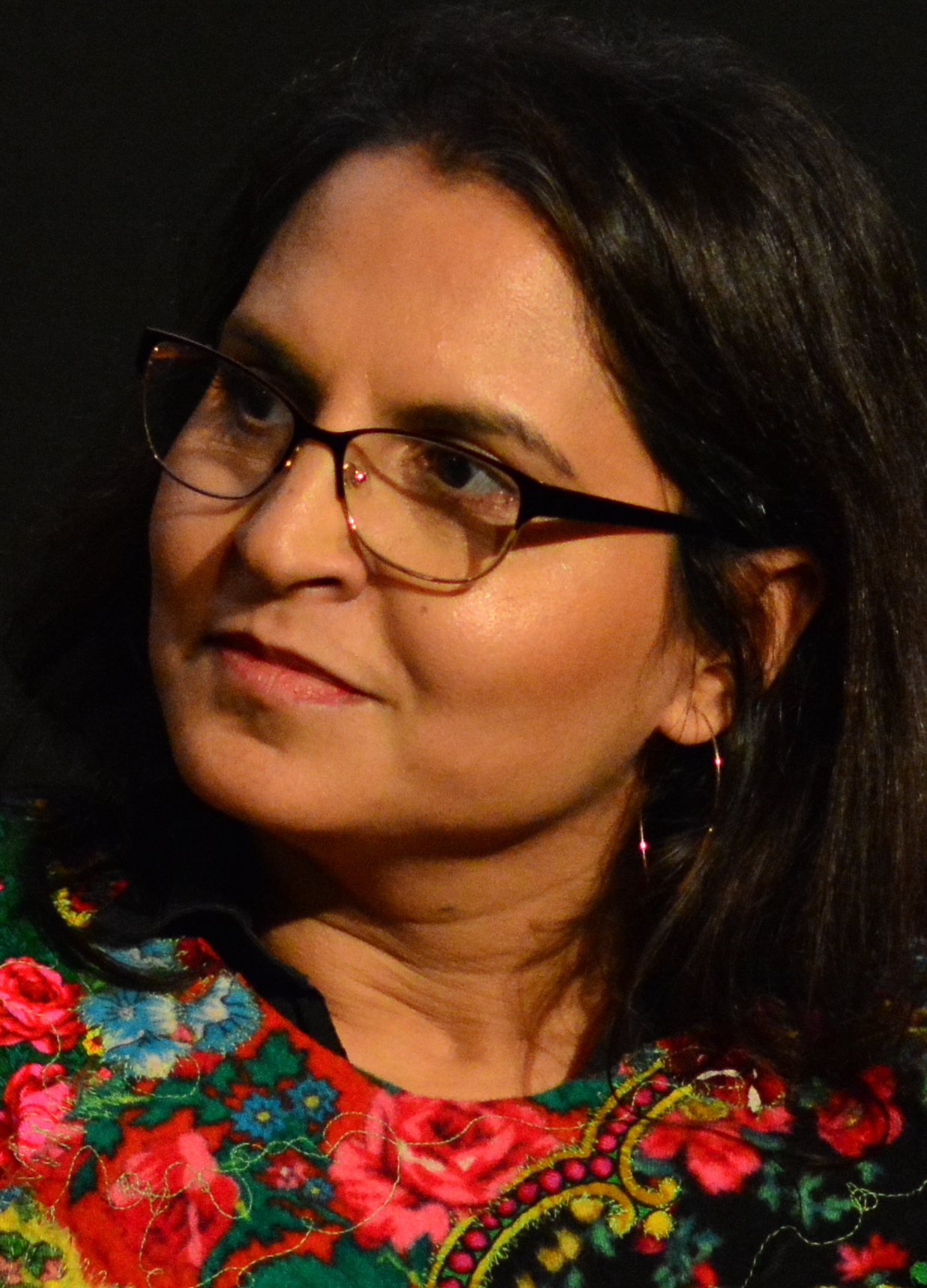
Former Romani CRISS executive director Margareta Matache, 2019

Romani CRISS (full name: Romani Center for Social Intervention and Studies, or Centrul Romilor pentru Intervenție Socială și Studii in Romania) is a Romanian non-government organisation which seeks to protect the rights of the country's Romani minority and to prevent discrimination against the Roma, who officially make up 3.3% of the country's population as of 2011, with an unofficial 2002 estimate of between 1.5 and 2 million, representing at least 8-9% of the population. It also conducts a series of projects in order to improve the situation of the Roma in education and health care. Romani CRISS was founded on April 4, 1993, and its executive director 2005-2012 was Margareta Matache. Its current executive director is Marian Mandache.

== See also ==
- Aven Amentza (another Romani NGO based in Romania)
- National Agency for the Roma
