= Caffè mocha =

Chocolate-flavored coffee drink

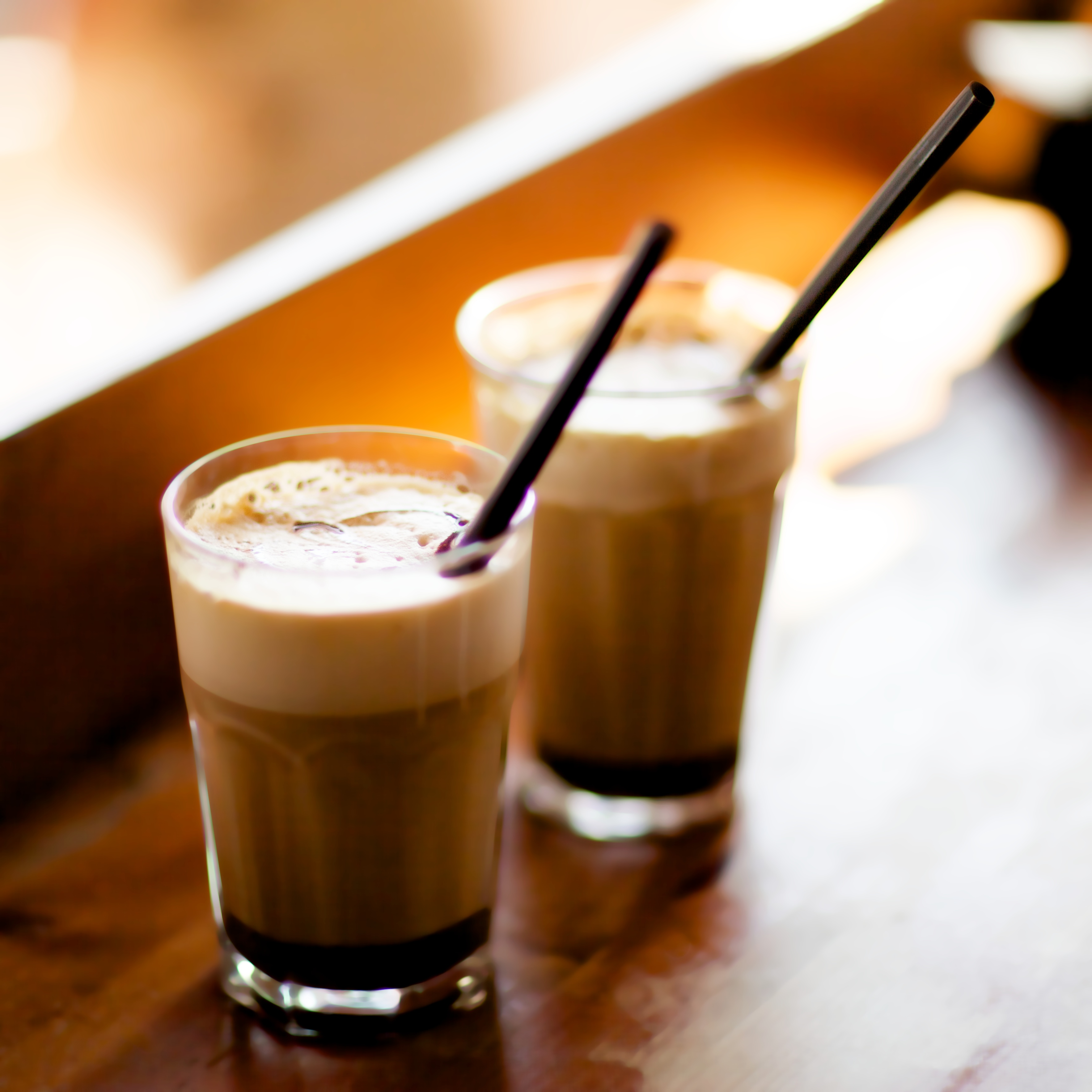
- Caffè mocha with a layer of espresso
- Alternative names: Mocaccino, mochaccino, mochachino
- Type: Beverage (hot and iced), milk coffee
- Place of origin: Yemen
- Region or state: Mokha, Taiz
- Main ingredients: Chocolate, espresso, and hot milk
- Variations: White caffè mocha

A caffè mocha (/ˈmɒkə/ MOK-ə or /ˈmoʊkə/ MOH-kə), also called a mocaccino (Note: Italian: [mokatˈtʃiːno]. Alternative spellings include mochaccino and also mochachino.) or simply mocha, is a chocolate-flavoured variant of caffè latte, commonly served warm or hot in a glass rather than a mug. The name is derived from the city of Mokha in Yemen, which was one of the centres of early coffee trade.

== Origin ==
The name "mocha" is derived from the Yemeni port of Mokha, which was a port well-known for its coffee trade from the 15th to 17th century, and where small quantities of fine coffee grown in the hills nearby was exported. When coffee drinking culture spread to Europe, Europeans referred to coffee imports from Arabia as Mochas, even though coffee from Yemen itself was uncommon and frequently mixed with beans from Abyssinia, and later coffee from Malabar or the West Indies were also marketed as Mocha coffee.

The coffee drink today called "mocha", however, is made by adding chocolate, and some assume that this is the result of confusion caused by the chocolate flavor that may sometimes be found in Yemeni coffee. Chocolate has been combined with coffee after chocolate drink was introduced to Italy in the 17th century; in Turin, chocolate was mixed with coffee and cream to produce bavareisa, which evolved in the 18th century into bicerin served in small clear glass where its components may be observed as three separate layers. However, prior to the 1900s, Mocha referred to Yemeni coffee; its meaning began to change around the turn of the 20th century, and recipes for food such as cakes that combined chocolate and coffee that referenced mocha began to appear. In 1920, a recipe for a "Chilled Mocha" was published with milk, coffee and cocoa as ingredients.

== Characteristics ==
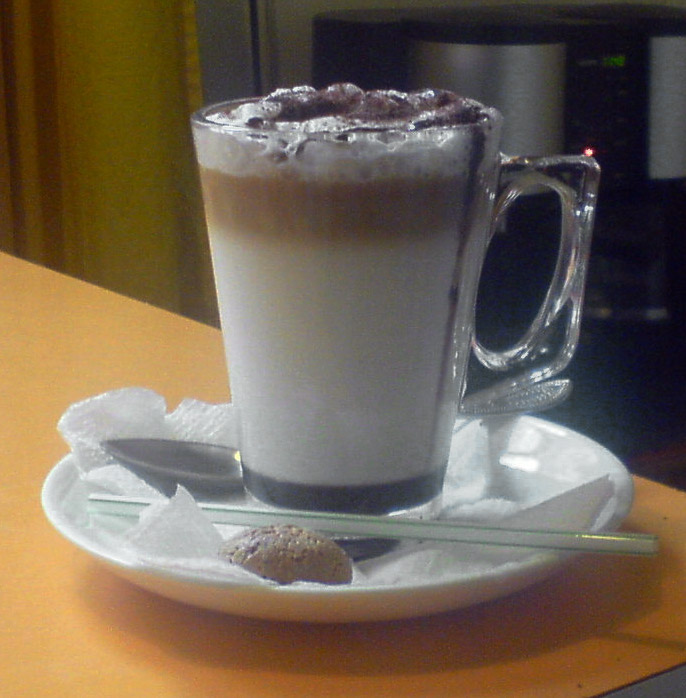
A caffè mocha with milk, Arabica Mocha espresso, milk froth, chocolate syrup, and various toppings, served with Amaretto cookie

Like caffè latte, caffè mocha is based on espresso and hot milk but with added chocolate flavouring and sweetener, typically in the form of cocoa powder and sugar. Many varieties use chocolate syrup instead, and some may contain dark or milk chocolate.

Caffè mocha, in its most basic formulation, can also be referred to as hot chocolate with (e.g., a shot of) espresso added. Like cappuccino, caffè mochas typically contain the distinctive milk froth on top; as is common with hot chocolate, they are sometimes served with whipped cream instead. They are usually topped with a dusting of either cinnamon, sugar or cocoa powder, and marshmallows may also be added on top for flavour and decoration.

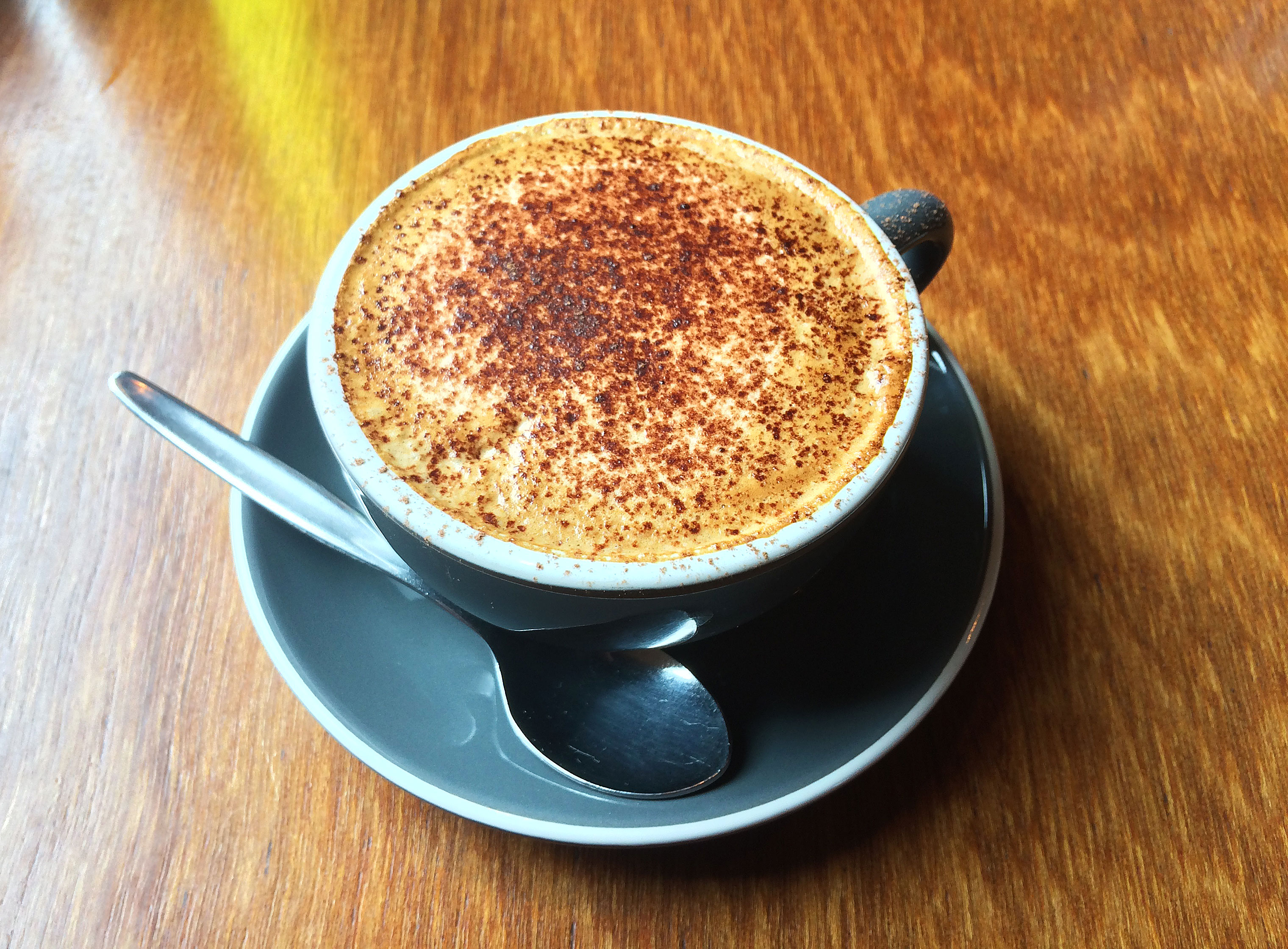
A mocaccino mocha in New Zealand

A variant is white caffè mocha, made with white chocolate instead of milk or dark. There are also variants of the drink that mix the two syrups; this mixture is referred to by several names, including black-and-white mocha, marble mocha, tan mocha, tuxedo mocha, and zebra mocha.

Another variant is a mochaccino which is an espresso shot (double) with either a combination of steamed milk and cocoa powder or chocolate milk. Both mochaccinos and caffè mocha can have chocolate syrup, whipped cream and added toppings such as cinnamon, nutmeg or chocolate sprinkles. French White Mocha is another name for Mochaccino, without cinnamon powder.

A third variant on the caffè mocha is to use a coffee base instead of espresso. The combination is coffee, steamed milk, and added chocolate. This is the same as a cup of coffee mixed with hot chocolate. The caffeine content of this variation is equivalent to that of the coffee it includes.

The caffeine content is approximately 430 mg/L (12.7 mg/US fl oz), which is 152 mg for a 350 mL (12 US fl oz) glass.

== See also ==
- List of coffee beverages
- List of hot beverages
- Mocha, Yemen
- Submarino
- Marocchino
- Cyclone Mocha
