= Bishop-bowl =

18th to 19th century Denmark punch bowl

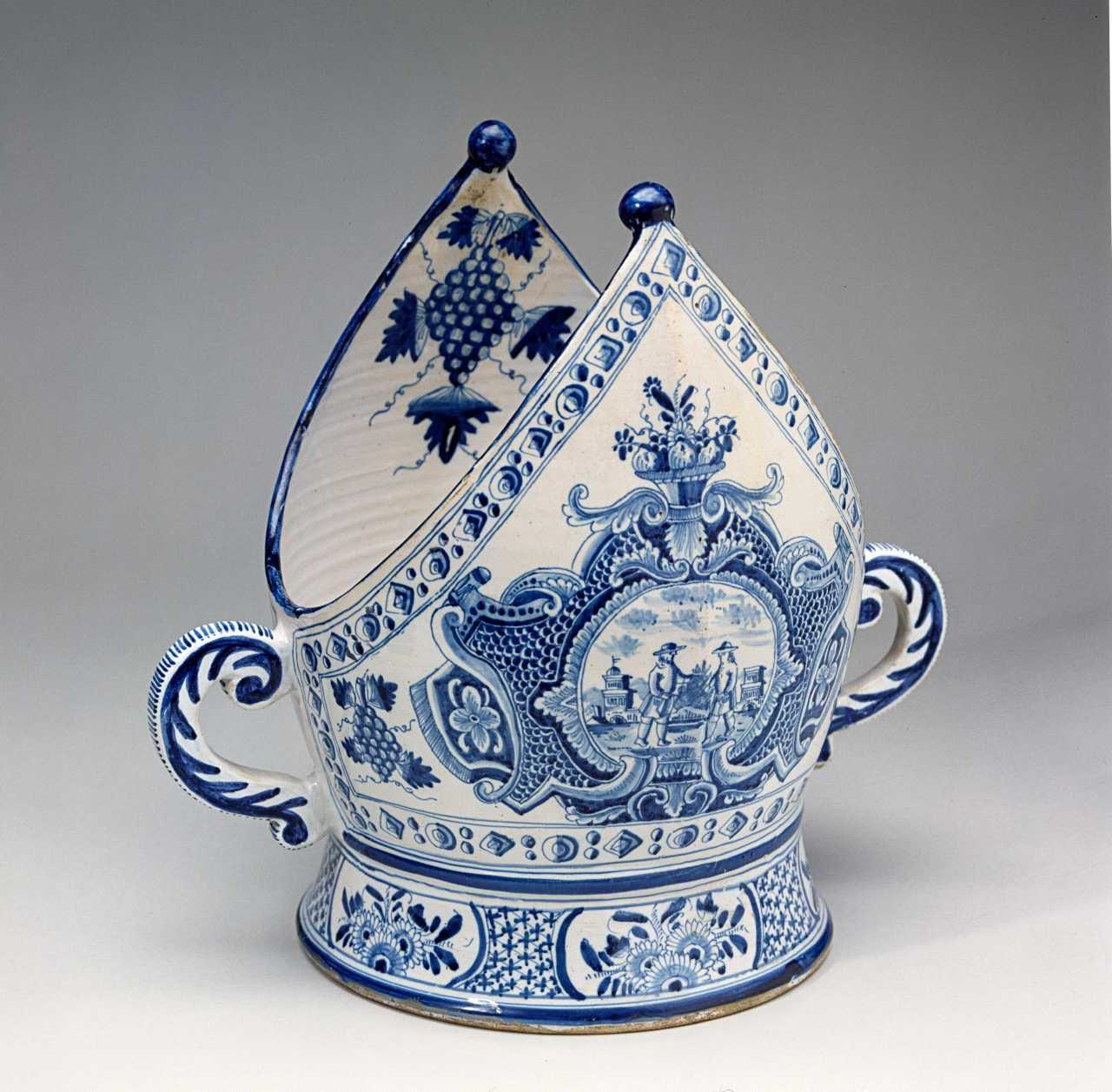
Bishop-bowl manufactured by the Store Kongensgade Factory in Copenhagen, Denmark

A bishop-bowl (Danish: bispebolle) is a punch bowl shaped in the form of a mitre. The bishop-bowl was popular in Denmark, Schleswig-Holstein, and Norway in the eighteenth and nineteenth centuries where it was used to serve an alcoholic drink known as biskop (lit. 'bishop').

The bowls were primarily produced in faience and were first manufactured in large quantities by the Store Kongensgade Faience Manufactury in Copenhagen. Bishop-bowls were later also manufactured in Schleswig-Holstein and Norway and were produced in porcelain as well as faience.

== History ==
The drink biskop is of German origins, where it was known as bischof. Its name refers to the violet colour of a bishop's garments. Biskop was one of several types of hot punch which became popular among the Danish nobility in the 18th century. The popularity of the punch led to the manufacture of special punch bowls shaped in the form of a bishop's hat or later as the figure of a bishop.

The first bishop-bowls in Denmark were produced at the Store Kongensgade factory, Denmark's first faience manufacturer, that was founded in 1722. The bishop-bowls were the most recognizable items produced by the Store Kongensgade factory. They were typically decorated in blue, though a small number were also produced in manganese violet. The bowls grew to popularity in Denmark in the early 1700s and soon spread to Norway, where they were produced by the Herrebøe Fajansefabrikk from the mid-1700s.

== The drink ==
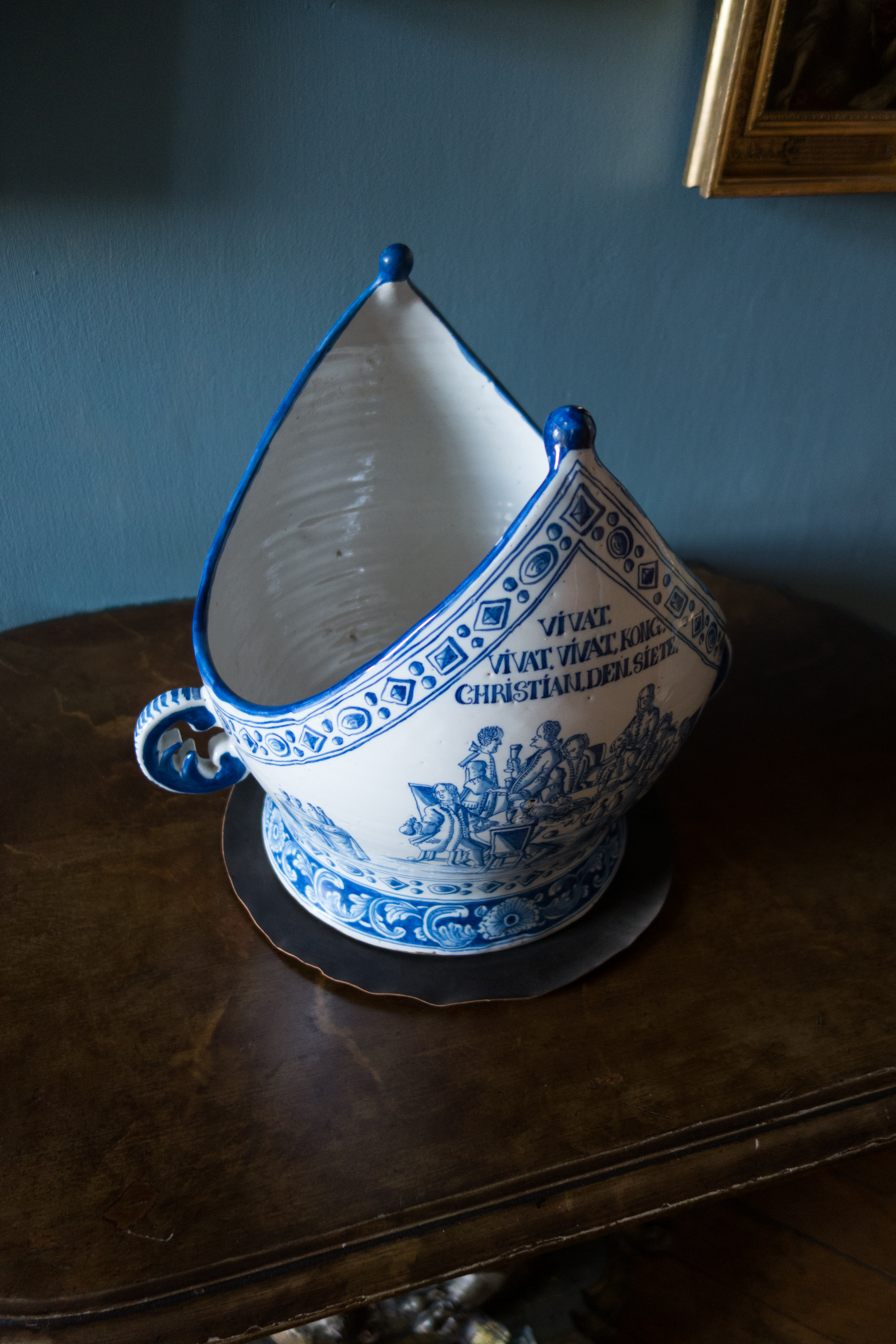
Bishop-bowl from Store Kongensgade with an inscription dedicated to Christian VI which reads "Vivat, Vivat, Vivat, Kong Christian den Siete". The bowl's decorations also include a depiction of a group drinking around a table.

The basic ingredients of biskop punch are red wine, sugar, and spices which vary by recipe. Most recipes call for bitter orange, orange zest, or orange juice, though others may call for cinnamon or ginger. Recipes from the second half of the 19th century frequently mention that rum can be added to improve drink's taste and shelf life.

A recipe for biskop from Beate Augustine Friedel's cookbook, Nye og fuldstændige Confectyr-bog eller grundig Underviisning til selv at forfærdige alle muelige Slags Conditorievare, was originally published in German, and was translated into Danish in 1795. It calls for three liters of red wine, 1.5 kilos of sugar and the zest and juice of six bitter oranges and 2-3 oranges.

An 1815 recipe by Christopher Jacobsen in the Nye Kogebog eller Anviisning til at koge, bage, stege, indsylte, henlægge, indslagte, anrette o.s.v. calls for a bottle of red wine, two bitter oranges, and sugar to taste. A later recipe by Anne Marie Mangor, published in her 1876 book, Kogebog for smaa Huusholdninger indeholdende Anvisning til forskellige Retters og Kagers Tillavning, also includes rum. It calls for a bottle of wine, 50 millilitres of rum, 125 grams of sugar, and the zest and juice of two small bitter oranges.

Biskop was often served warm. However, unlike Danish gløgg, the drink was also served cold or on ice. The 1935 Old Waldorf-Astoria Bar Book lists a recipe for "bishop" to be served in a pitcher, which calls for sugar, lemon juice, rum, a bottle of red wine, and ice.

== Legacy ==
Early bishop-bowls from Store Kongensgade Faience Manufactury are on display at The David Collection in Copenhagen and at the Museum of National History at Frederiksborg Castle in Hillerød. Bishop-bowls from a manufacturer in Schleswig can be seen St. Anne's Museum in Lübeck.

Den Gamle By has a bishop-bowl shaped in the form of a seated bishop made in Kellinghusen in Holstein circa 1770. The figure is 34 cm high and the upper half comes off as a lid.

A Danish stamp from 1970 features a drawing of a bishop-bowl. The drawing was created by Claus Achton Friis.

== See also ==
- Danish cuisine
- Mulled wine
- Smoking bishop
