= Smoking bishop =

Type of mulled wine, punch or wassail

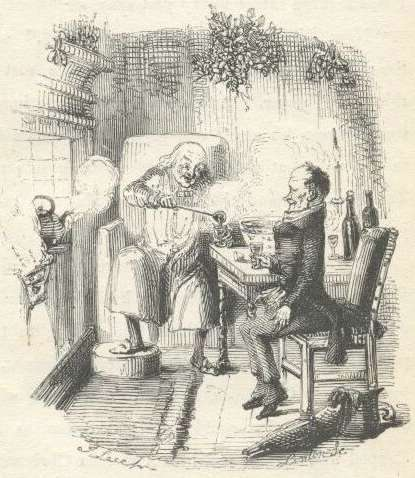
"...we will discuss your affairs this very afternoon, over a Christmas bowl of smoking bishop, Bob!" — Ebenezer Scrooge

Smoking bishop is a type of mulled wine, punch, or wassail, especially popular in Victorian England at Christmas time, and it is mentioned in Dickens' 1843 story A Christmas Carol.

Smoking bishop was made from port, red wine, lemons or Seville oranges, sugar, and spices such as cloves. The citrus fruit was roasted to caramelise it and the ingredients then warmed together. A myth persists that the name comes from the shape of the traditional bowl, shaped like a bishop's mitre, and that in this form, it was served in medieval guildhalls and universities.

Other variations of drinks known collectively as "ecclesiastics" included the smoking archbishop (made with claret), the smoking beadle (made with ginger wine and raisins), the smoking cardinal (made with Champagne or Rhine wine) and the smoking pope (made with burgundy).

== Recipe ==
The mitre-shaped punchbowl, as illustrated in Eliza Acton's Modern Cookery

Eliza Acton published a recipe in her Modern Cookery in 1845:

Make several incisions in the rind of a lemon, stick cloves in these, and roast the lemon by a slow fire. Put small but equal quantities of cinnamon, cloves, mace, and allspice, with a race of ginger, into a saucepan with half a pint of water: let it boil until it is reduced one-half. Boil one bottle of port wine, burn a portion of the spirit out of it by applying a lighted paper to the saucepan; put the roasted lemon and spice into the wine; stir it up well, and let it stand near the fire ten minutes. Rub a few knobs of sugar on the rind of a lemon, put the sugar into a bowl or jug, with the juice of half a lemon (not roasted), pour the wine into it, grate in some nutmeg, sweeten it to the taste, and serve it up with the lemon and spice floating in it.

Bishop is frequently made with a Seville orange stuck with cloves and slowly roasted, and its flavour "to many tastes is infinitely finer" than that of the lemon.

== See also ==
- List of hot beverages
- Bishop-bowl
- Mulled Wine
