= Anijsmelk =

Dutch milk drink

Anijsmelk is a Dutch drink consisting of hot milk flavoured with anise seed and sweetened with sugar. One traditional use takes place during ice skating. Anijsmelk is also said to have a soporific effect. The drink can be made from scratch, but it is more common to use tablets called anijsblokjes, made with anise flavouring and sugar; the tablets are dissolved in hot milk. Anijsblokjes were made by the company De Ruijter from at least the 19th century; however, the machine that was used to make these aniseed and sugar blocks broke down and was irreparable due to age. Since then, the product has been sold in powder sachets.

== See also ==
- List of hot beverages
