= Aleberry =

Aleberry is a beverage made by boiling ale with spice (such as nutmeg), sugar and bread-sops, the last commonly toasted. It is sweetened, strained, and drunk hot. The word is "a corruption of ale-bree ... bree (Anglo-Saxon brin, broth)."

Aleberry was often used as a domestic remedy for a cold.

William Salmon gives a recipe for aleberry in his The family dictionary, or, Houshold [sic] companion, published 1695:

Aleberry: Boil Ale or Beer a Quart, scum it well, put in slices of fine Manchet, and blades of large Mace, boil it well, and put in some Sugar, with a sprig or two of Rosemary; strain it and drink it hot. It is not only Strengthening, but very good against Colds and Rheums.

== See also ==
- Lamb's wool, a similar drink made with roasted apple
- Posset, a hot drink of milk curdled with wine or ale
- List of hot beverages
