= Espressino =

Italian coffee drink

Espressino is an Italian coffee drink originating in the Apulia region. Espressino is usually served in a demitasse.

== Composition ==
It is prepared with equal parts of espresso and milk, with some cocoa powder on the bottom of the cup and on top of the drink. An espressino freddo is a cold coffee drink with differing ingredients. It is similar to the marocchino and bicerin.

== See also ==
- List of coffee drinks
- Marocchino and bicerin – similar drinks
