= Store Kongensgade Faience Manufactury =

Danish ceramics manufacturer

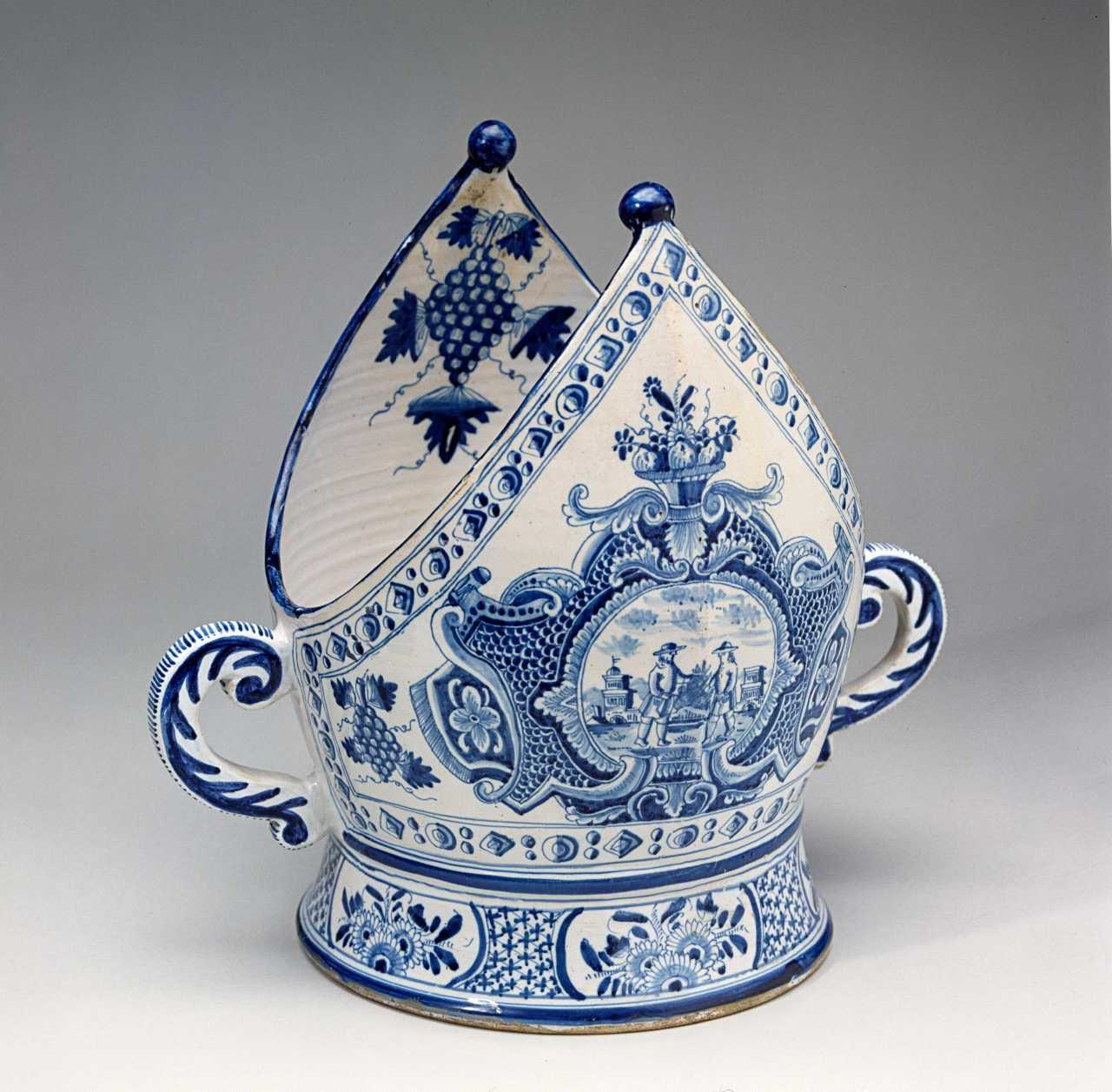
Bishop-bowl from c. 1735 from Store Kongensgade Faience Manufactury

Store Kongensgade Faience Manufactury, active from 1722 to the late 1770s, was a faience ceramics manufacturer located on Store Kongensgade in Copenhagen. It was the first manufacturer of faience in the Nordic countries. It is especially remembered for its bishop-bowls and tray tables but has also produced decorative tiles for several historic buildings.

== History ==
On 27 November 1722, Frederick IV granted a consortium a royal license to establish a faience manufactury in Copenhagen with a monopoly on the production of faience with blue decorations. The factory was located at the corner of Store Kongensgade and present-day Fredericiagade and variously referred to as Delf's Porcelins Fabrique or Hollandsch Steentøjs Fabrique. One of the founders was Rasmus Æreboe.

The first director of the factory was Johan Wolff. He was succeeded by Johan Ernst Pfau (c. 1685-1752) in 1728.

Christian Gierløf (1706-86), a brewer, took over the factory in 1749. He was soon faced with new competition, both from Jacob Fortling's Kastrup Værk on Amager, an enterprise in Schlesvig and especially a faience manufactury established by Peter Hofnagel in Østerbro. Hofnagel had previously owned Herrebö Faience Manufactury in Norway. The factory in Store Kongensgade struggled up through the 1760sm culminating with the termination of its monopoly on faience with blue decorations in 1769. It closed before 1779.

== Products ==
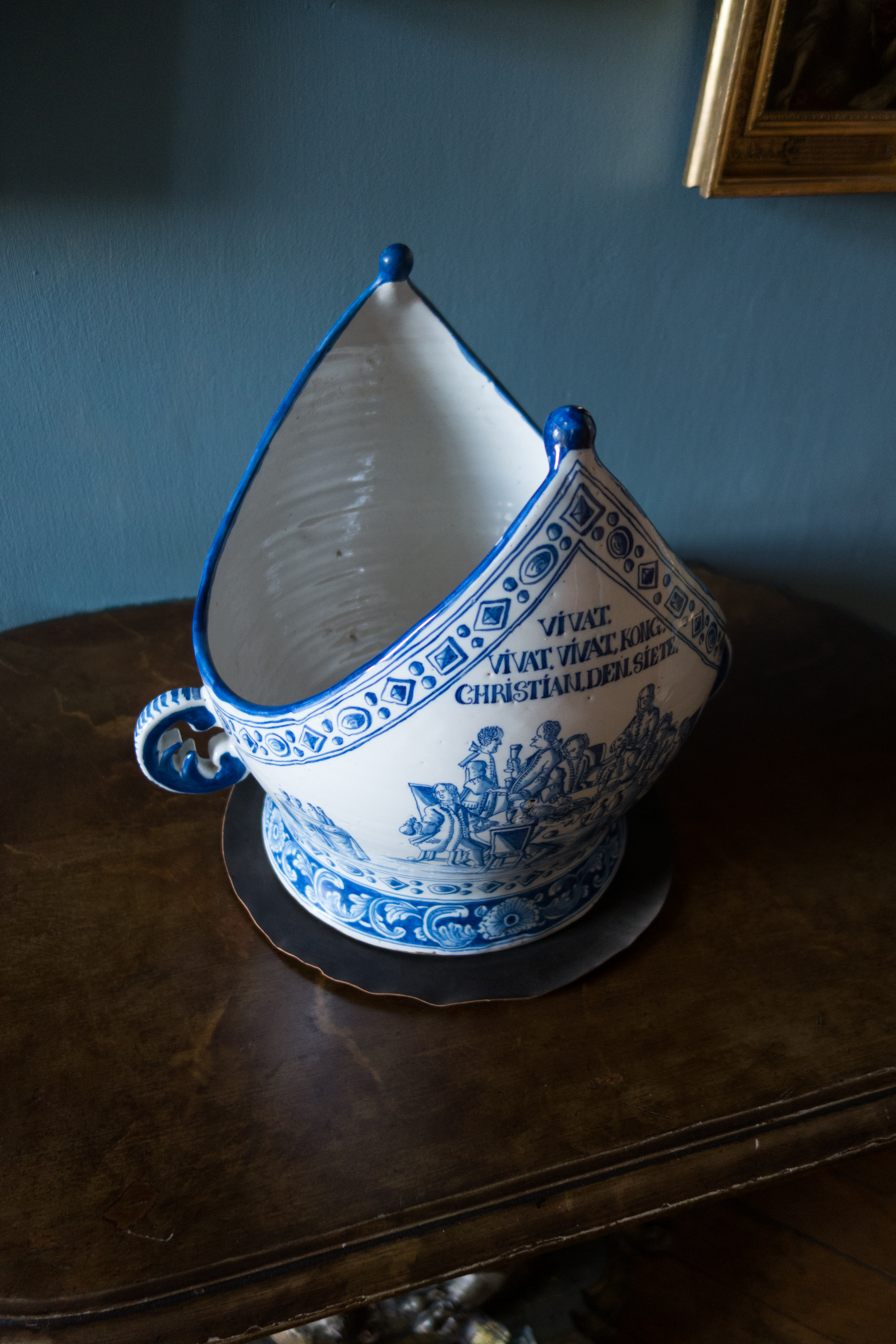
Punch bowl from the factory on display at Frederiksborg Castle

A characteristic product from the faience factory in Store Kongensgade was so-called bishop-bowl, a type of punch bowl designed in the shape of a mitre (bishop's hat) and used for serving an alcoholic drink known as "bishop". The factory is also known for its tray tables. The porcelain has usually blue but manganese violet decorations are occasionally seen. More everyday items and tiles were also produced at the factory.

== Legacy ==
The tiles in the Queen's Pancake Kitchen at Frederiksberg Palace (1735) and on the staircase in the Hermitage in Jægersborg Dyrehave north of Copenhagen (1737) came from the factory in Store Kongensgade.

A tray table (1749-1771), a punch bowl (1740) and a Plateau (1726) from the factory are on display in The David Collection in Copenhagen.
