= Aven Amentza =

Aven Amentza is a Romanian non-government organisation established in 1997 that seeks to improve the social position of the country's Roma minority, while also enhancing Roma rights and combating anti-Roma discrimination. It is also involved in research activities that analyse the situation of the Roma in Romania.
