= Mulled wine =

Heated red wine with spices

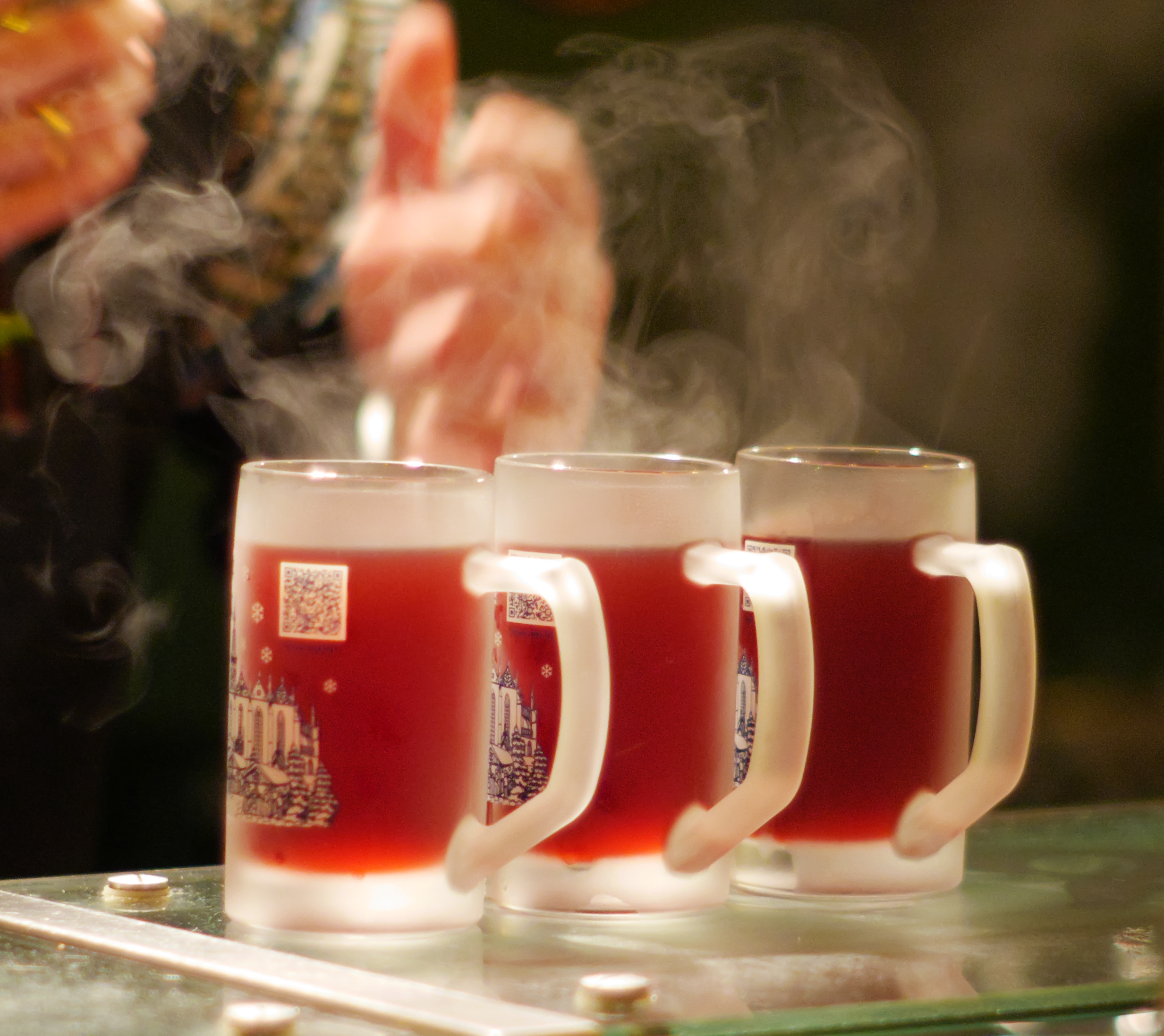
- Mulled wine served in glass mugs at a Christmas market in Germany
- Alcohol by volume: 0–15%
- Ingredients: Wine (red), spices and fruit
- Variants: Glühwein, Glögg, and many others

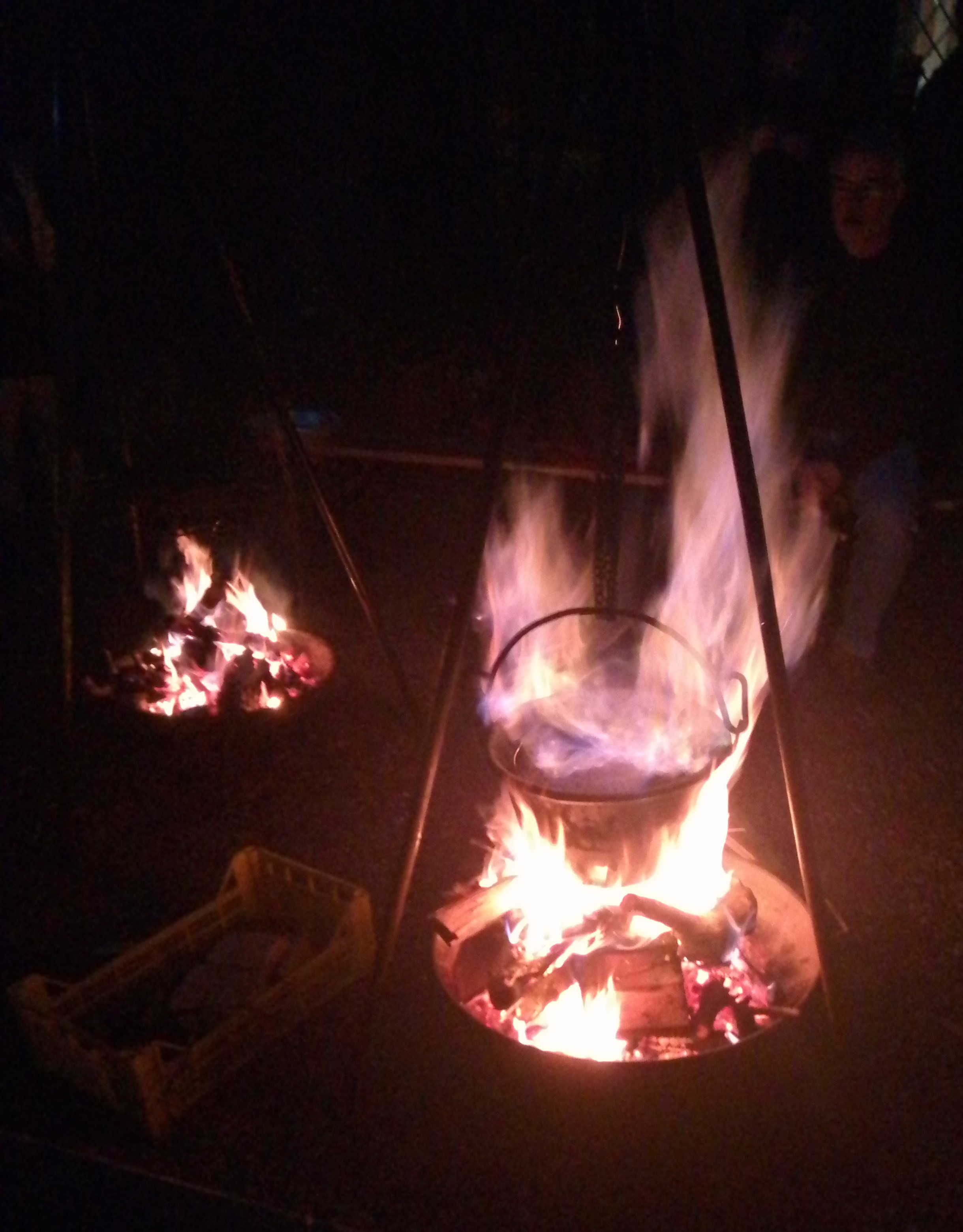
Mulled wine made on the brazier

Mulled wine, also known as spiced wine, is an alcoholic drink usually made with red wine, along with various mulling spices and sometimes raisins, served hot or warm. It is a traditional drink during winter, especially around Christmas. It is usually served at Christmas markets in various European countries. There are non-alcoholic versions of it.

== Origins ==
The first record of wine being spiced and heated can be found in Plautus' play Curculio, written during the 2nd century BC. The Romans travelled across Europe, conquering much of it and trading with the rest. The legions brought wine and viticulture with them up to the Rhine and Danube rivers and to the Scottish border, along with their recipes.

The Forme of Cury, a medieval English cookery book from 1390, which mentioned mulled wine, says: "Pur fait Ypocras ..." grinding together cinnamon, ginger, galangal, cloves, long pepper, nutmeg, marjoram, cardamom, and grains of paradise ("spykenard de Spayn", rosemary may be substituted). This is mixed with red wine and sugar (form and quantity unstated).

== United Kingdom ==
Mulled wine is very popular and traditional in the United Kingdom at Christmas, and less commonly throughout winter. Mulled cider (and sometimes mulled ale, traditional yet no longer common) is also served, with a mulled apple juice as a non-alcoholic alternative.

=== In traditional culture ===
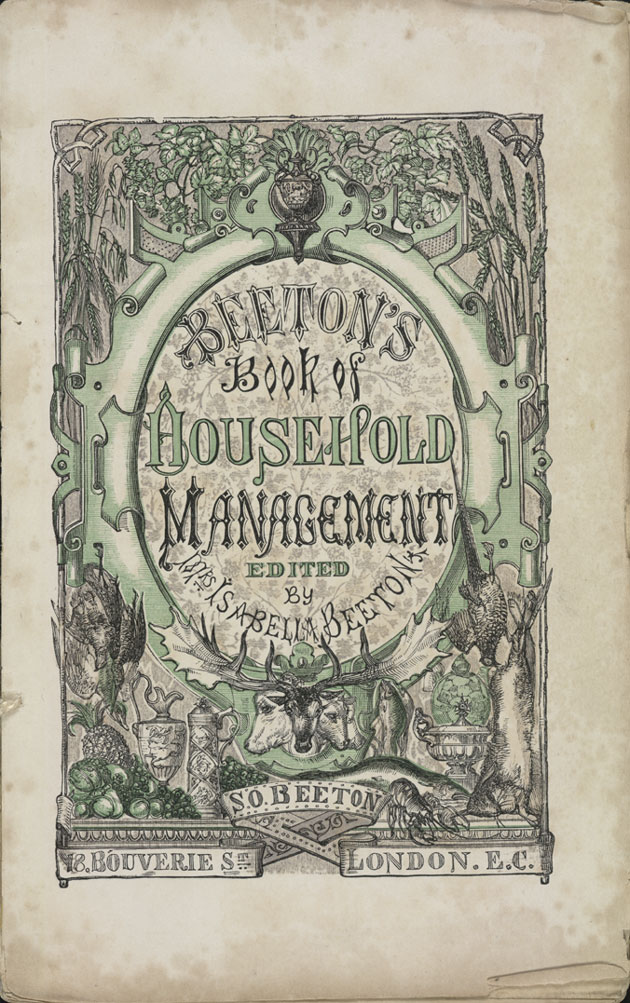
The cover of Mrs. Beeton's book

Over the years the recipe for mulled wine has evolved with the tastes and fashions of the time. One Victorian example of this is smoking bishop, mentioned by Charles Dickens but no longer drunk or known in modern culture. A more traditional recipe can be found in Mrs. Beeton's Book of Household Management at paragraph 1961 on page 929 to 930 of the revised edition dated 1869:

TO MULL WINE.
INGREDIENTS.- To every pint of wine allow 1 large cupful of water, sugar, and spice to taste.

Mode.-In making preparations like the above, it is very difficult to give the exact proportions of ingredients like sugar and spice, as what quantity might suit one person would be to another quite distasteful. Boil the spice in the water until the flavour is extracted, then add the wine and sugar, and bring the whole to the boiling point, then serve with strips of crisp dry toast, or with biscuits. The spices usually used for mulled wine are cloves, grated nutmeg, and cinnamon or mace. Any kind of wine may be mulled, but port and claret are those usually selected for the purpose, and the latter requires a very large proportion of sugar. The vessel that the wine is boiled in must be delicately cleaned and should be kept exclusively for the purpose. Small tin warmers may be purchased for a trifle, which is more suitable than saucepans, as, if the latter are not scrupulously clean, they spoil the wine, by imparting to it a very disagreeable flavour. These warmers should be used for no other purpose.

=== In contemporary culture ===
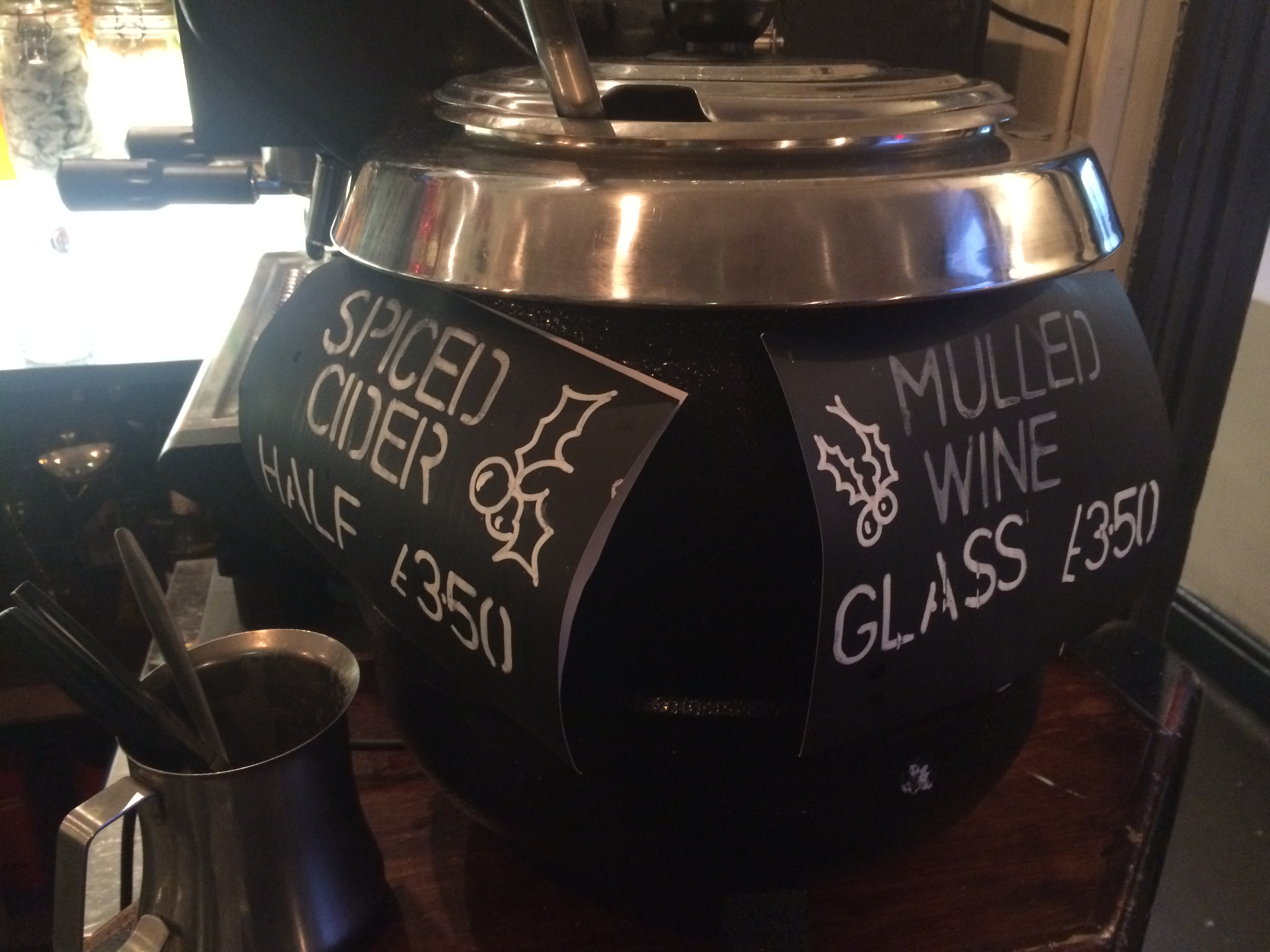
A British pub selling mulled wine and spiced (mulled) cider in December

In contemporary British culture, there is no specific recipe for mulled wine and the spices involved in its recipe. It is commonly a combination of orange, lemon, cinnamon, nutmeg, fennel seed (or star anise), cloves, cardamom, and ginger. The spices may be combined and boiled in a sugar syrup before red wine is added, heated, and served. Variations include adding brandy or ginger wine. A tea bag of spices can be added to the wine, which is heated along with slices of orange as a convenient alternative to a full recipe. Mulled wine is often served in small (200 ml) porcelain or glass mugs, sometimes with an orange slice garnish studded with cloves.

Mulled wine and ales infused with mulling spices are available in the UK in the winter months. Wassail punch is a warm mulled beer or cider drunk in winter in Victorian times.

== Glühwein ==
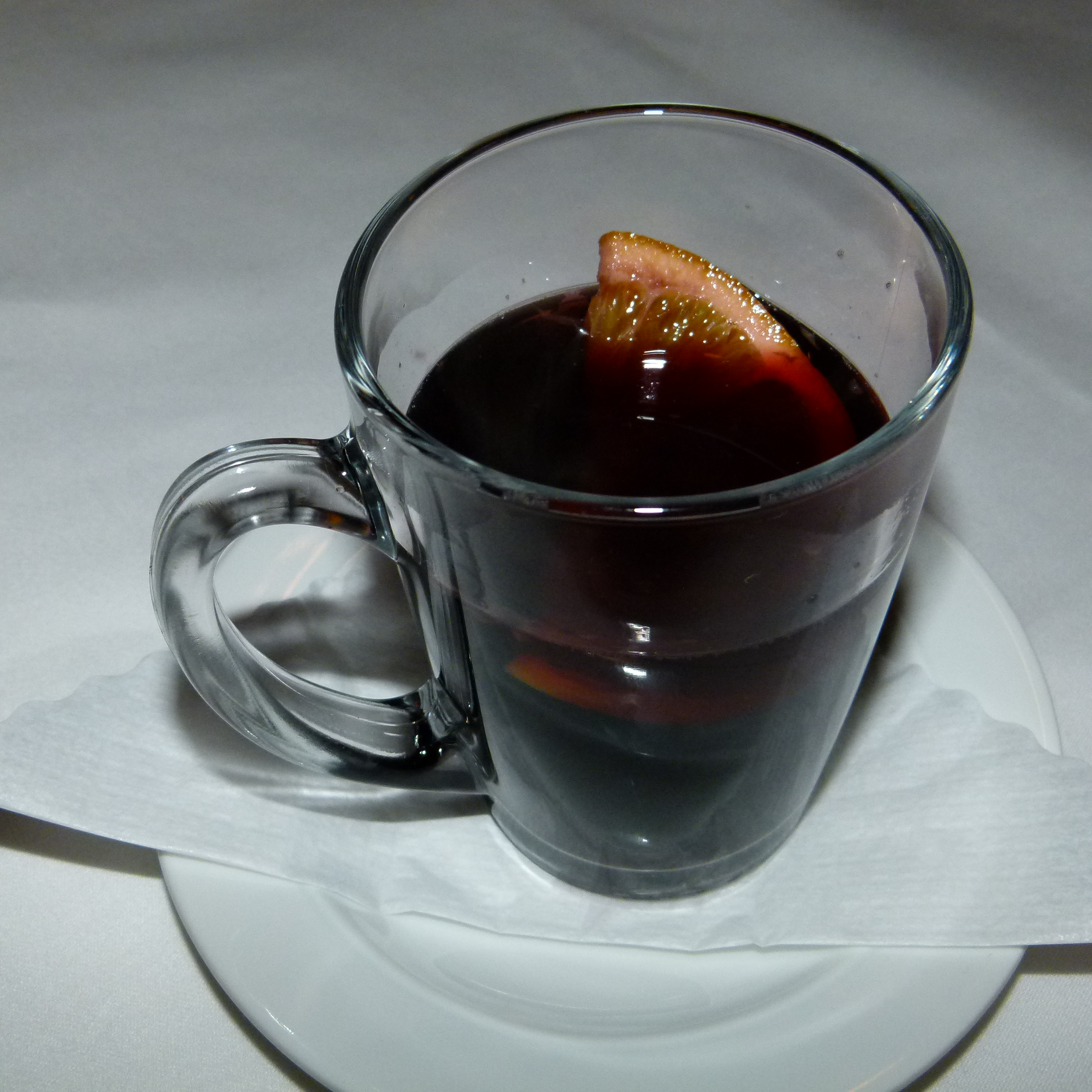
A cup of Glühwein

Glühwein (roughly translated as 'glowing-wine', from the temperature the wine is heated to) is popular in German-speaking countries, the Germany-bordering Alsace region of France, and to a lesser extent Russia. It is a traditional beverage offered during the Christmas holidays. In Alsace Christmas markets, it is traditionally the only alcoholic beverage served. The oldest documented Glühwein tankard is attributed to Count John IV of Katzenelnbogen, a German nobleman who was the first grower of Riesling grapes. This gold-plated lockable silver tankard is dated to c. 1420.

Glühwein is usually prepared from red wine, heated and spiced with cinnamon sticks, cloves, star aniseed, orange, sugar and at times vanilla pods. It is sometimes drunk mit Schuss (with a shot), which means that rum or some other liquor has been added. Fruit wines, such as blueberry wine and cherry wine, are occasionally used instead of grape wine in some parts of Germany. A variation of Glühwein is made with white wine, but it is less popular than its red counterpart. For children, the non-alcoholic Kinderpunsch is offered on Christmas markets, which is a punch with similar spices.

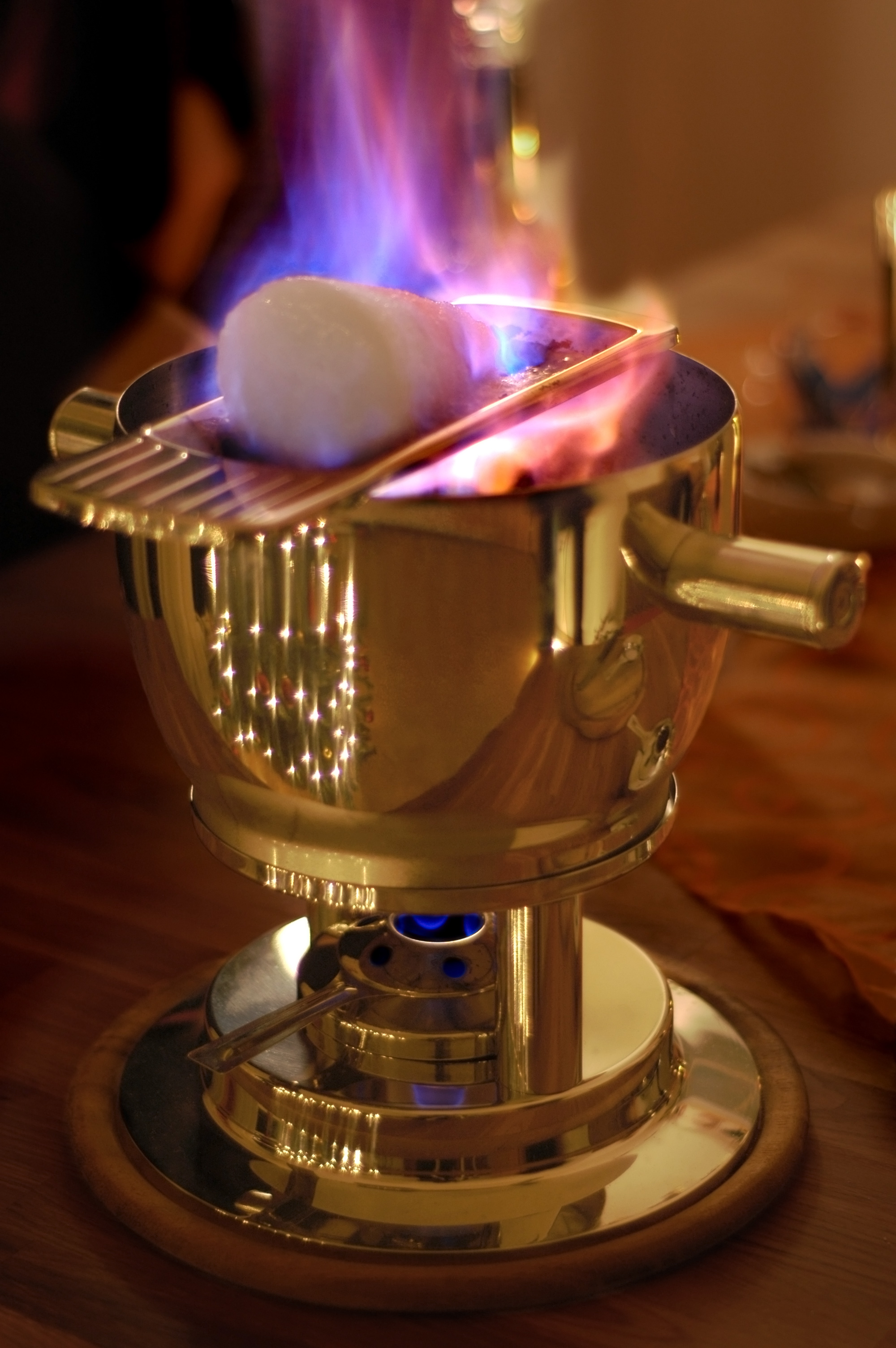
Feuerzangenbowle

Another popular variant of Glühwein in Germany is Feuerzangenbowle. It shares the same recipe, but for this drink a rum-soaked sugarloaf is set on fire and allowed to drip into the wine. Polish type of Glühwein is called Grzaniec. It is similar to the German one with one exception—it is usually sweetened with honey instead of sugar.

== Glögg ==
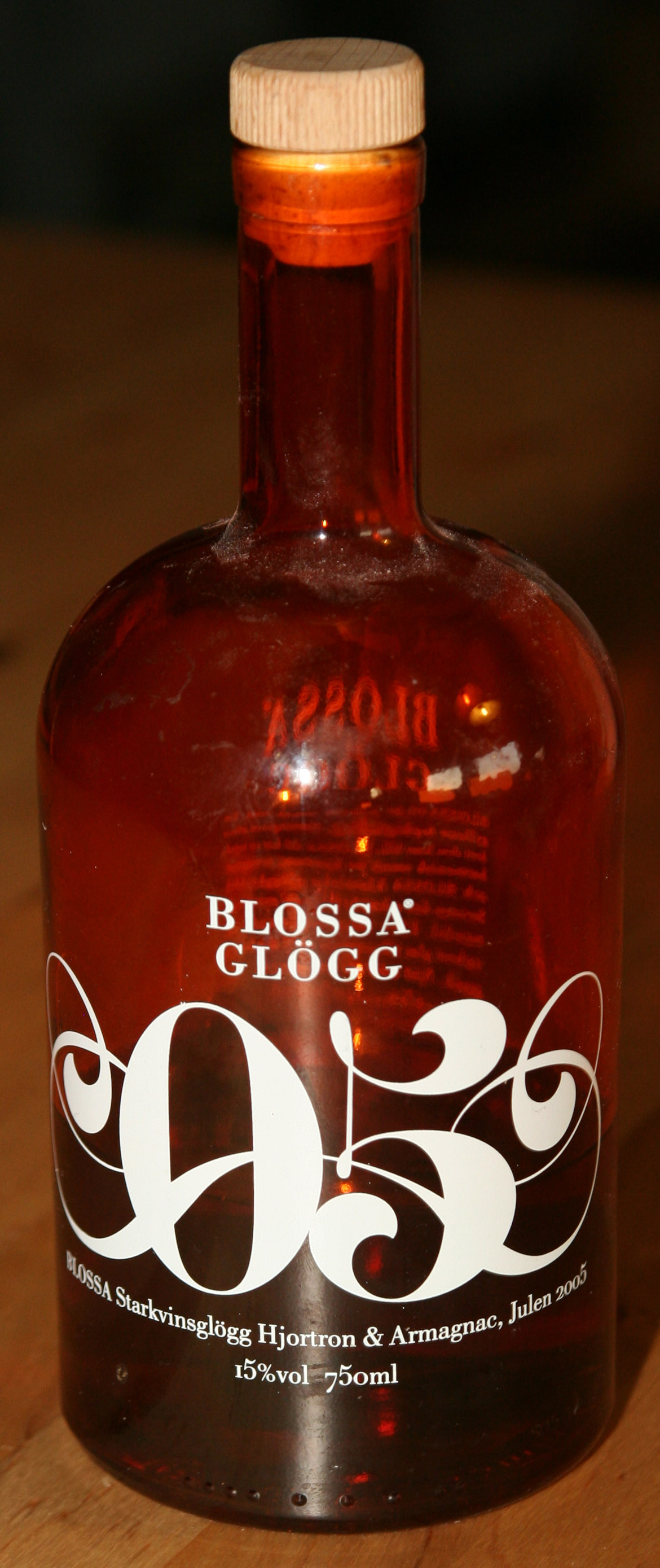
Readymade glögg (Blossa brand, Sweden)

Glögg, gløgg, glögi and similar words are the terms used for mulled wine in the Nordic countries and Estonia (sometimes spelled as glog or glug). It is spelled gløgg in Norwegian, Danish and Faroese, glögg in Swedish and Icelandic and glögi in Finnish and Estonian. In Denmark, Norway, Sweden and Finland gløgg or glögg is often drunk at Christmas events.

Non-alcoholic and alcoholic versions of glögg can be bought ready-made or prepared with fruit juices instead of wine. The main ingredients of alcoholic glögg are red wine, sugar, spices such as cinnamon, cardamom, ginger, cloves, and bitter orange, and optionally also stronger spirits such as vodka, akvavit, rum or brandy. Throughout Scandinavia, glögg spice extract and ready-mixed spices can be purchased in grocery stores. To prepare glögg, spices or spice extract are mixed into the wine, which is then heated to 60–70 °C. When preparing homemade glögg using spices, the hot mixture is allowed to infuse for at least an hour, often longer, and then reheated before serving. Ready-made wine glögg, as well as low- or non-alcoholic varieties, is normally sold at Systembolaget in Sweden, and in Alko in Finland, ready to heat and serve, and not in concentrate or extract form. Glögg is generally served with raisins, dried cloves, blanched almonds and ginger biscuits (gingerbread cookies), and is a popular hot drink during the Christmas season.

In Sweden, ginger bread and lussebullar (also called lussekatter), a type of sweet bun with saffron and raisins, are typically served on December 13 to celebrate Saint Lucia's Day. It is also traditionally served at the julbord, the Christmas version of the classic, Swedish buffet smörgåsbord. In Denmark, gløgg pairings typically include æbleskiver sprinkled with powdered sugar and accompanied with strawberry marmalade. In Norway, gløgg is paired with risengrynsgrøt (rice pudding). In such cases, the word graut-/grøtfest is more precise, taking the name from the rice pudding which is served as a course. Typically, gløgg is drunk before eating the rice pudding, which is often served with cold, red cordial (saus).

Glögg recipes vary widely; variations with white wine or sweet wine such as Port or Madeira, or spirits such as brandy, schnapps or whisky are also popular, either added directly or by soaking the raisins and spice in them before preparing the drink (often resulting in a notable increase in the alcohol contents). Glögg can also be made without alcohol by replacing the wine with fruit or berry juices (often blackcurrant) or by boiling the glögg to evaporate the alcohol. Glögg is similar in taste to modern Wassail or mulled cider.

== Other countries ==
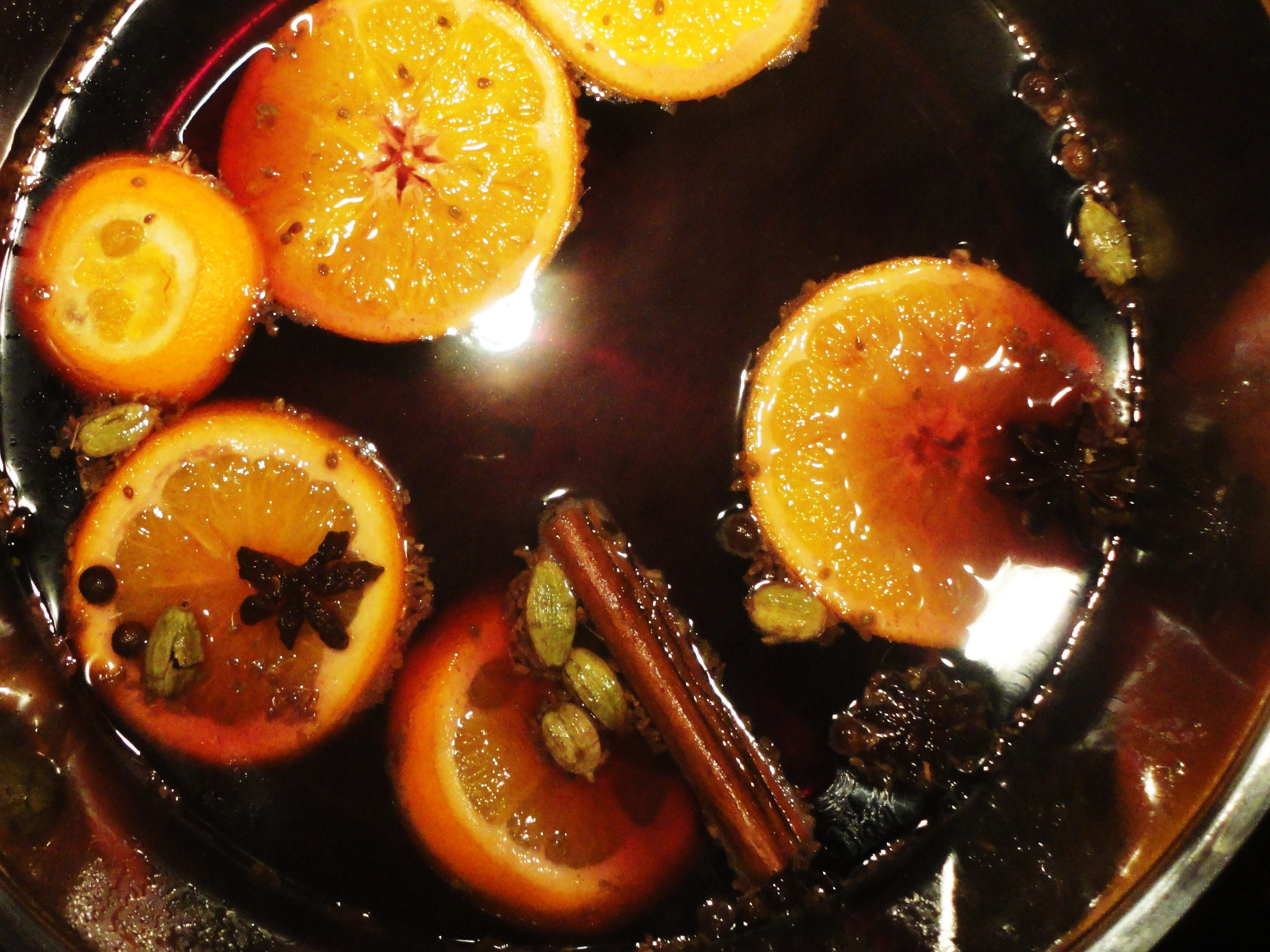
Mulled wine steeping with spices and fruit

In Croatia, Slovenia, Bosnia and Herzegovina, Montenegro and Serbia, kuhano vino or kuvano vino (Serbo-Croatian Cyrillic: кувано вино, lit. 'cooked wine'), is made from red or white wine and various combinations of nutmeg, cloves, cinnamon, aniseed sugar/honey or orange zest, often served with slices of orange or lemon. In North Macedonia, it is called vareno vino (Macedonian: варено вино, 'boiled wine') or greeno vino (Macedonian: греено вино, 'heated wine') and is usually served in late autumn or winter. It is made of red wine, usually from the Tikveš region, combined with cinnamon and sugar or honey. The wine, heated in combination with pepper, is used as a folk remedy for cold and flu.

In the south and southeast of Brazil, it is called vinho quente or quentão, from the same Portuguese drink. It is typically made with red wine, cinnamon sticks and cloves. Cachaça may be added to increase the alcohol content. It is served as part of the Festa Junina, celebrated during winter in the month of June.

In Bulgaria, it is called greyano vino (Bulgarian: греяно вино, 'heated wine'), and consists of red wine, honey and peppercorn. Sometimes apples or citrus fruits, such as lemon or oranges, can be added.

In Chile, it is called candola in the south and vino navega'o in the north (navegado, lit. 'sailor'; 'navigated' is considered a hypercorrection). Navega'o is a hot drink made from red wine, orange peels, cinnamon sticks, cloves, and sugar. Although being considered a southern Chile beverage, it is served throughout the country. Many people regard it as a winter drink. Saint John's Eve (Spanish tradition which replaced Wetripantru, the Mapuche New Year's Day that coincides with the Winter Solstice in the southern hemisphere—Midsummer in the northern hemisphere) on the evening of 23 June would be, for example, a good time to drink navega'o.

In the Czech Republic, mulled wine is called svařené víno ('boiled wine'), colloquially svařák. In Slovakia, mulled wine is called varené víno ('boiled wine'), and is usually served during the Christmas season.

In France, vin chaud ('hot wine') typically consists of red wine mixed with honey, cinnamon, and orange. It must not be too sweet. Beverage noted in the Alps for winter sports. In Geneva, Switzerland, vin chaud is consumed during the festivities surrounding L'Escalade.

In Hungary, forralt bor ('boiled wine') is typically made from the country's popular Egri Bikavér and spiced with cinnamon, sugar and cloves. Sometimes Amaretto is added for extra taste.

In Italy, mulled wine is typical in the northern part of the country and is called vin brülé (from the French vin brûlé, 'burnt wine', though the expression is not used in France).

In Latvia, it is called karstvīns ('hot wine'). When out of wine, it is prepared using grape (or currant) juice and Riga Black Balsam. In Lithuania, it is called glintveinas or karštas vynas ('hot wine').

In Romania, vin fiert ('boiled wine') is typically made with cinnamon, sugar and oranges. Red wine is the most common type but white wine is also used. In Moldova vin fiert is made from red wine with black pepper and honey.

In some parts of the Netherlands and Belgium, the drink is known as bisschopswijn ('bishop's wine'), but not generally. Bisschopswijn is drunk during the Sinterklaas holidays in did regions, but a majority of the Netherlands calls it Glühwijn and it's drunk throughout December, usually closer to Christmas period than Sinterklaas.

In Poland, grzane wino ('heated wine'), or grzaniec in highlander dialect, is very similar to the Czech variant, especially in the southern regions. There is also a similar method for preparing mulled beer, or grzane piwo, which is popular with Belgian beers because of the sweet flavor of that particular type of beer, which uses the same spices as mulled wine and is heated. Vodka-spiked mulled wine can be found in Polish Christmas markets, where mulled wine is used as a mixer.

In Portugal, mainly in the Douro and Minho Provinces, it is called vinho quente and made with Madeira wine and port wine, in the Porto region Porto Quente is more popular.

In Russia and Ukraine, glintveyn (глинтвейн) is a popular drink during winters and has same recipe as the German Glühwein. Russian dusheparka (Russian: душепарка) is a historical analogue of mulled wine. Additionally, the traditional Russian winter herbal drink sbiten, although usually a non-alcoholic tisane made with hot water, may also be made with red wine replacing some or all of the water.

== In popular culture ==
In the 1946 Christmas movie It's a Wonderful Life, after the 293-year old guardian angel Clarence Odbody (traveling with George Bailey to an alternate world if George had not been born) goes to a rough bar. And, not knowing what to order since he had not been to a bar in centuries, decides to order, "I was just thinking of a flaming rum punch. No, it's not cold enough for that. Not nearly cold enough…Wait a minute…wait a minute…Mulled wine, heavy on the cinnamon and light on the cloves. Off with you, me lad, and be lively!"

There is also a German UFA (Universum Film AG) movie called Feuerzangenbowle (1944) with Heinz Rühmann, one of Germany's most popular actors at the time. It is based on the novel by the same title from 1933, written by Heinrich Spoerl and directed by Helmut Weiss. The film is prefaced with an adapted quote from the novel: "This film is a paean to school, but it is possible that the school will not realize it." In it, you can see the actors preparing and drinking Feuerzangenbowle from a big glass bowl. The film has become a traditional movie around many German households during Christmas.

== See also ==
Media related to Mulled wine at Wikimedia Commons

- Aromatised wine – Fortified wine flavoured with herbs, spices, fruit or other natural flavouring
- Christmas dishes
- Ginger wine – Fortified wine
- Glögg – Swedish mulled wine
- Grog – Variety of alcoholic beverages
- Hippocras – Drink of spiced, sweetened wine
- List of hot drinks
- Negus – Spiced drink made of wine and hot water
- Rakomelo – Greek alcoholic drink
- Wassail – Hot mulled cider, ale or wine

== Bibliography ==
- "Get into the Holiday Spirit with Scandinavian Glogg". All Things Considered. NPR. 22 December 2011.
