= Ale =

Type of beer brewed using a warm fermentation method

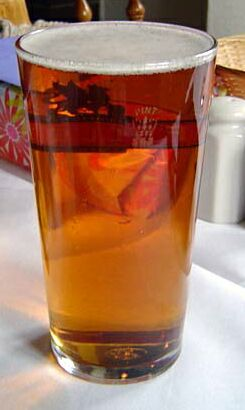
A glass of real ale from an English pub

Ale is a style of beer, brewed using a warm fermentation method. In medieval England, the term referred to a drink brewed without hops.

As with most beers, ale typically has a bittering agent to balance the malt and act as a preservative. Ale was originally bittered with gruit, a mixture of herbs or spices boiled in the wort before fermentation, before hops replaced gruit as the bittering agent. In England, however, it was also common to brew ale without adding herbs.

== Etymology ==
The word ale comes into English from its ancestor-language, Proto-Germanic. English belongs to the West Germanic branch of Proto-Germanic, and some other languages in this branch also attest to the word: Middle Dutch āle and ael, and the Old Saxon word alo-fat 'ale-cup'. The word is also found throughout the North Germanic languages, almost certainly appearing in ancient runic inscriptions in the form alu, and subsequently in Old Norse as ǫl. Through linguistic reconstruction it is possible to infer that the Common Germanic form of this word was *alúþ-. According to the third edition of the Oxford English Dictionary, however, the origin of this word is 'uncertain and disputed'.

Research by Harald Bjorvand, however, has favoured the following explanation: the Germanic word *alú-þ- descends from the Indo-European word **olú-t- (from an earlier Indo-European base *h₂elut-), which originally meant 'golden or reddish colour'. Other Indo-European words related to this root include Old Indic aruṣá- ('reddish'; the r comes from an earlier l, *alu-sá-) and Old High German elo ('yellowy, pale yellow, reddish yellow, tawny'). The Indo-European word *olú-t- then came to refer specifically to ale because this is its colour, giving rise to both the Germanic word *alú-þ- and the Ossetic word æluton.

In this account, the Indo-European word *olú-t- was also borrowed into the Finnic languages, giving Finnish olut and Estonian õlu.

The relationship of similar words in the Slavonic languages (such as Old Bulgarian olu 'cider', Slovenian ol 'beer') and the Baltic languages (Lithuanian alus, Latvian alus, 'beer', Old Prussian alu 'mead') remains uncertain.

== History ==
Ale was an important source of nutrition in the medieval world. It was one of three main sources of grain in the diet at the start of the fourteenth century in England, along with pottage and bread.

Scholars believe grains accounted for around 80% of the calorie intake of agricultural workers and 75% for soldiers - even nobles received around 65% of their calories from grains.

Small beer, also known as table beer or mild beer, which was highly nutritious, contained just enough alcohol to act as a preservative, and provided hydration without intoxicating effects. Small beer would have been consumed daily by almost everyone, including children, in the medieval world, with higher-alcohol ales served for recreational purposes. The lower cost for proprietors combined with the lower taxes levied on small beer inevitably led to the selling of some beer labeled "strong beer" that had actually been diluted with small beer.

Records from the Middle Ages show that ale was consumed in huge quantities. In 1272, a husband and wife who retired at Selby Abbey were given 2 gallons of ale per day with two loaves of white bread and one loaf of brown bread.

Monks at Westminster Abbey consumed 1 gallon of ale each day. In 1299, Henry de Lacy's household purchased an average of 85 gallons of ale daily and in 1385–86 Framlingham Castle consumed 78 gallons per day.

A mention of 'ealu wæge' (ale-cup) in Beowulf

Brewing ale in the Middle Ages was a local industry primarily pursued by women. Brewsters, or alewives, would brew in the home for both domestic consumption and small scale commercial sale. Brewsters provided a substantial supplemental income for families; however, only in select few cases, as was the case for widows, was brewing considered the primary income of the household.

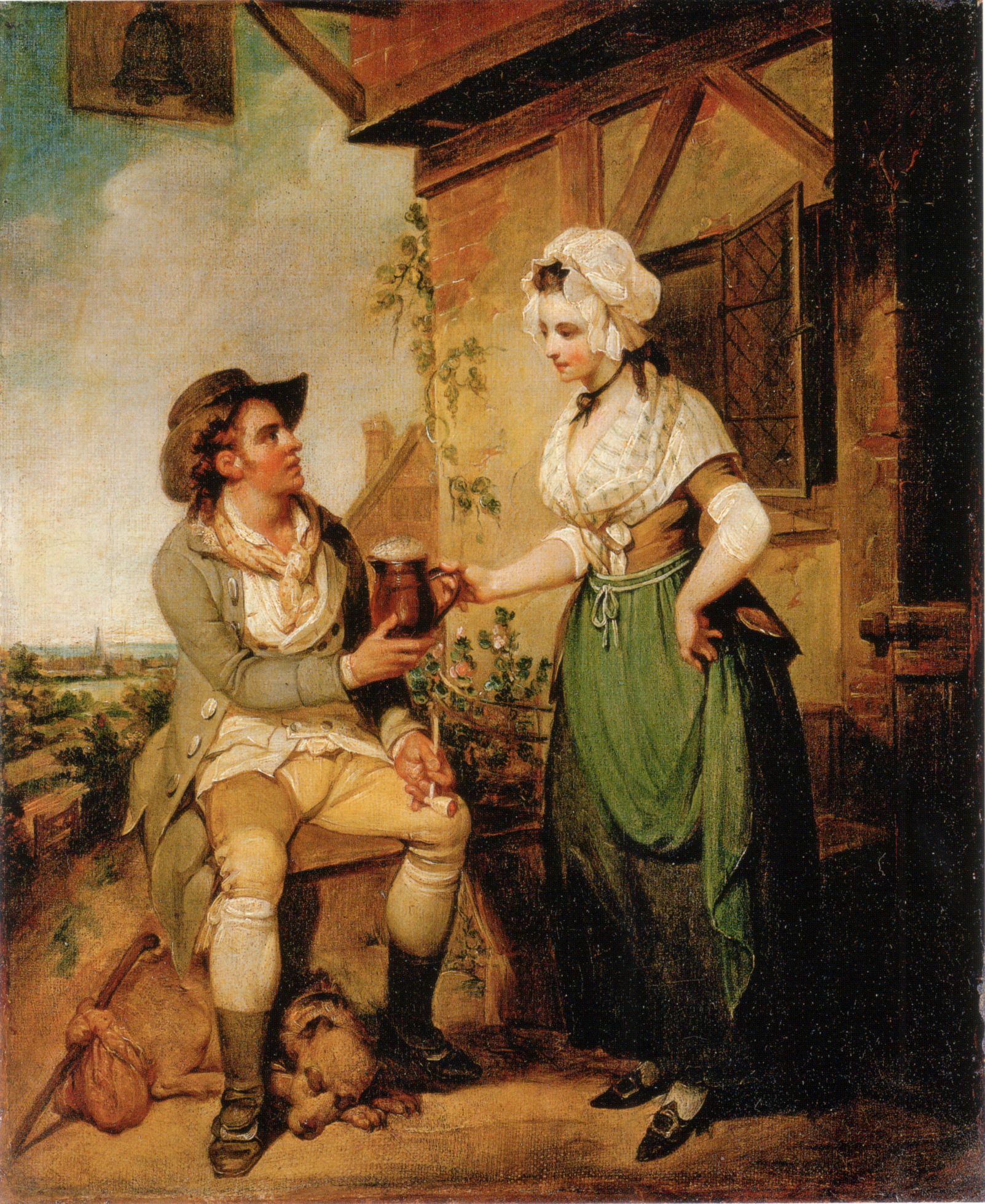
"The Ale-House Door" (Henry Singleton, c. 1790)

From the mid-17th century, strong ales became particularly fashionable. They were known by names such as Huff-Cap, Nippitate and Hum-Cup, so called because it caused "a humming sensation in the head". Strong ale, like wine, was typically decanted due to the high sediment content into small glasses, which were better suited to the high ABV ale.

Chambers' Cyclopædia of 1741 states that "Ale is chiefly distinguished from beer ... by the quantity of hops used therein; which is greater in beer, and therefore renders the liquor bitterer, and fitter to keep."

== Modern ale ==
Modern ale is typically fermented at temperatures between 15 and 24 °C (59 and 75 °F). At temperatures above 24 °C (75 °F) the yeast can produce significant amounts of esters and other secondary flavour and aroma products, and the result is often a beer with slightly "fruity" compounds resembling those found in fruits, such as apple, pear, pineapple, banana, plum, cherry, or prune.

=== Modern beer yeast ===
==== Sulfur metabolism ====
When ale ferments, it naturally creates two prevalent byproducts, those being Sulfur Dioxide (SO2) and Hydrogen Sulfide (H2S). Each of these compounds affects the product in different ways, and each can be managed before and during the fermenting process to create different flavours and benefits for the ale.

$\ce{SO2}$

Sulfur Dioxide is a product of some of the initial ingredients of ale and is produced during the fermentation of the wort. Sulfur Dioxide helps to increase an ale's shelf life; however, it naturally occurs in foods when they become old, so many people react negatively to its smell and can even be viewed as an allergen in some countries. During the stages of fermentation of ale, the production of SO2 works as an antioxidant, a preservative, and, in addition, it works to fight bacteria. Throughout the fermentation process, one of the ways in which brewers can control the levels of SO2 is through temperature during brewing, and another way to preserve that reaction is by tempering with the temperature at which the product is stored. The cooler it is stored, the more SO2 is preserved, which helps the ale keep its flavour.

When an ale becomes stale from oxidation, it loses its natural flavours; it could taste like any multitude of different undesirable things, depending on the initial flavour of the ale. Some of the most common tastes for people are that of sherry, where the flavours have gotten negatively sweeter, or that of cardboard or paper, where it tastes stale and bland.

$\ce{H2S}$

Hydrogen sulfide is another byproduct of fermentation. In yeast strains, it helps the yeast grow and also works as an antioxidant later in the fermentation process. Having a chemical compound including sulfur, however, means that it has a pungent smell that people often associate with rotten eggs, which can later affect the produced ale negatively, so producing and managing a finite amount of hydrogen sulfide is very important in the fermenting of ale. When controlled, the amount of H2S is generally unnoticeable and does not affect the overall smell or taste, but still does its job of keeping the shelf life of the ale.

==== Sugar utilization ====
While making ale, sugar can be added either during the boiling stage or the fermenting stage; however, both times lead to similar outcomes, just at different levels of effectiveness. The benefits of adding sugar to a brew can be to increase the overall APV levels of the brew and the flavour at the end of the brewing process. Due to the higher APV, however, the body of the beer can often be left thinner, having a water-like consistency. Both the factors of APV levels and flavour depend on what type of sugar you are adding, and oftentimes, when you add them in the process. Generally, the later a sugar is added to the brew, the more prominent the flavour will be. Sugar can be added so long as it is fermentable, which most common sugars are. Generally, brewers will add different syrups, saps, honeys, and syrups to their ale.

==== Flocculation ====
Flocculation is the tendency for the yeast to conglomerate into large masses at the top and bottom of the fermentation tank at the end of the fermentation process. This selective trait in the yeast came about as the majority of the yeast that gets repurposed is that which aggregates and gets easily removed. This selective trait is gradually characterized in most yeast as the yeast that exhibits this behavior lasts a greater number of generations.

=== "Real ale" ===
"Real ale" is a British term, coined by the Campaign for Real Ale, for cask and bottle-conditioned beer.

== Varieties ==
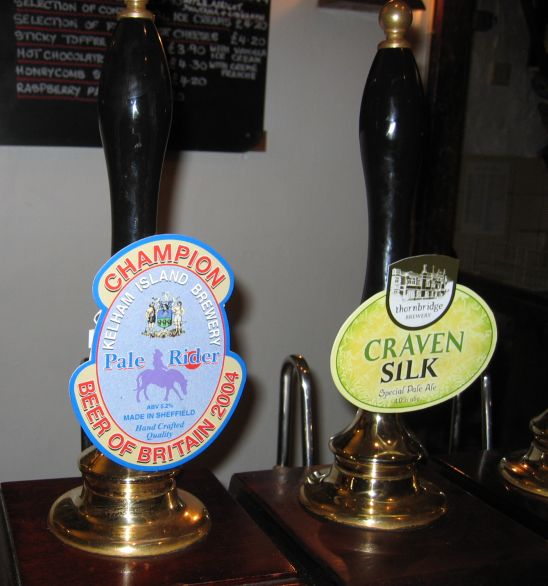
Cask ale handpumps

The following list breaks the many various ales into separate, diverse categories. The ales listed are categorized into their respective style groups of origin and accompanied by information regarding the specific brew. For further classification, more comprehensive information can be found in the Brewers Association Style Guide.

=== British origin ale styles ===
==== Pale ale ====
In 18th-century England, brewers coined the term "pale ale" to distinguish this golden-hued ale from the more prevalent dark ales of the time. The use of hops during fermentation introduces a distinctive bitter aroma, while the general absence of diacetyl groups and the presence of esters contribute to a sweeter and fruitier flavour compared to other ales. The average alcohol by volume (ABV) of these ales ranges from 3.2% to 5.3%.

==== Scotch ale ====
Scotch ale, also known as "wee heavy", boasts an exceptionally malty taste accented by sweet malty undertones due to the heavy concentration of esters. Generally low in bitterness, it exhibits a deep caramel colour, the shade of which may vary depending on the brewing techniques. They have a relatively high ABV, falling between 6.6% and 8.5%.

==== Summer ale ====
British-style summer ale is characteristically lighter in gold colour. Filled with esters, this beer yields a fruity flavour and maintains a subdued yet weak profile in bitterness and hop. The ale is traditionally high in carbonation due to its respective brewing techniques. Falling within the standard ABV range of 3.7% to 5.1% aligns with most beer's typical potency.

==== Old ale ====
Old ale is classified as an intensely dark red ale. It is said to have a fruity aroma, with brewers occasionally adding caramel to sweeten the product. The hop flavouring and bitterness of an old ale are relatively low compared to other types of categorized ales. Adequately brewing an old ale involves an aging process spanning a few years. Upon completion, it yields an extremely sweet drink comparable to wine. The final ABV of the ale ranges from 5.0% to 9.3%, with higher percentages correlating to the amount of sugar added during fermentation.

==== Brown ale ====
Brown ale, distinguished by its dark hue, is commonly enriched with a blend of roasted and caramel malts, leading to a distinctively unique toffee-flavoured ale. Both esters and diacetyl are found in low levels, contributing to the beer's unique taste. The ABV of brown ales typically ranges between 4.2% and 6.0%.

==== Barley wine ====
Barley wine is known for its balance of flavour and high alcohol content. The ale's colour varies widely depending on the duration of its age, as its flavour profile evolves dramatically over time. Low levels of diacetyl and carbonation are found in all barely wines, while esters are found in high quantities, contributing to a low bitter fruity flavour and aroma. The flavours of barley wines are diverse, ranging from bread-like to hints of molasses and toffee. They have an unusually high ABV, ranging from 8.5% to 12.2%.

==== India pale ale ====
India pale ale, commonly shortened to IPA, is a hoppy pale ale which was originally shipped to colonial India. Its high hop content prevented spoilage during the long sea course from England to India. IPA is full bodied and hoppy, it is amber coloured and usually somewhat opaque. The ABV of IPA can fall within the range of 4.5–20%.

=== North American origin ale styles ===
==== Amber ale ====
Amber ale is an American craft beer named after the hue it possesses from being flavoured using caramel malt. The ale is brewed with an assortment of hops and has a balanced flavour. It maintains a low level of esters and lacks any trace of diacetyl, leading to a moderately bitter and slightly fruity undertone. The ABV of amber ales ranges anywhere from 4.4% to 5.4%.

==== Sour ale ====
Sour ale, more commonly known as wild ale, is characterized by a unique sour flavour, produced during fermentation when acid-producing bacteria like lactobacillus or acetobacter feed on sugars. The acidity produced comes from mild concentrations of lactic or acetic acid and further develops during the aging process. Utilizing wooden bourbon barrels imbued with either vanillin or sherry plays a crucial role in augmenting the beer's flavour complexity during aging. The presence of esters and diacetyl fluctuates depending on the sought-after flavour profile of the brew. The final ABV varies widely depending on the length and methods used during brewing.

=== Belgian and French origin ale styles ===
==== Table beer ====
Table beer typically has a low ABV of around 0.5% - 2.0%. Popular in Eastern Europe, these beverages are brewed with malt barley, wheat, oats, or rye. They are commonly flavoured with additive sugar and either orange or lemon peels to yield a citrus-like flavouring.

==== Session ale ====
Session ale, named for its purpose of being enjoyed within a single "session" without inducing significant intoxication, features a low ABV, typically ranging from 3% to 5%. Though they share similarities with table beers, they maintain a higher alcohol percentage. They are characterized by a balanced flavour profile, as the production method does not stray far from traditional ale brewing. Esters may be present in medium quantities adding sweetness to the final flavour, while diacetyl is non-existent. Most commercially available ales fall under the distinction of session ales due to their cost-effective ability to be brewed in mass.

==== Strong dark ale ====
The flavour profile of dark ale is characterized by a malty sweetness resulting from the abundance of esters in the brew. A discernible spiciness is attributed to yeast-derived phenolic compounds present in moderate quantities. Depending on the brand, the beer tends to have a modest level of bitterness owing to the hops during fermentation. The aroma of the brew is described as subtle yet persistent, due to phenol compounds. In terms of ABV, dark ale ranks notably high compared to other brews, ranging from 7.1% to 11.2%, often veiled by its diverse flavour profile.

==== Bière de Garde ====
Bière de Garde is a hybrid beer whose name translates from French to English as “Beer for Keeping”. The ale is low to moderate in esters and contains a similar malt sweetness to most other ales. The ale's ABV ranges from 4.4% to 8% and has a range of appearances, with its primary descriptions being “Light Amber, Chestnut Brown, or Red.” While most popular in France, this style has become much more frequent in the U.S. as the ale industry grows.

=== Irish origin ale styles ===
==== Irish red ale ====
Irish red ale is characterized by its definitive amber or dark red hue, having an ABV ranging from 4.0% to 4.8%, and having a standard approachable bitterness, all of which make this ale highly sessionable. Medium flavours of candy-like caramel malt distinguish the ale, and a tan foam forms at the top, due to the inclusion of roasted barley.

=== German origin ale styles ===
==== Altbier ====
Originating in the Düsseldorf region of Germany, Altbier pays homage to traditional brewing methods, with "alt" meaning old in English. The complexion ranges from light amber to a deep copper colour. Esters are present in low quantities, which is attributed to their lightly citrus profile, while diacetyls are completely absent. The ale boasts a moderate level of bitterness owing to hops utilized in fermentation. Its ultimate ABV falls within the range of 4.6% to 5.6%, aligning typically with other ales.

== See also ==
- Aleberry, a beverage made by boiling ale with spice
- Beer measurement, information on measuring the colour, strength, and bitterness of beer
- Beer style
- Spiced ale
- Strong ale
