= Submarino (drink) =

Chocolate beverage

The submarino (meaning "submarine" in Spanish) or remo (meaning "oar") is a beverage traditionally drunk in Argentina and Uruguay. It consists of a bar of dark chocolate melted inside a glass of hot milk and stirred with a long spoon (similar to an iced tea spoon) until the chocolate is completely dissolved.

It is most typically enjoyed in the winter, and is traditionally served in a long, glass cup held in a metal cup holder. The holder is designed with a handle so that the glass can be held without burning oneself, as the submarino is served piping hot to ensure that the chocolate melts completely.

The following images show the traditional preparation of the submarino:

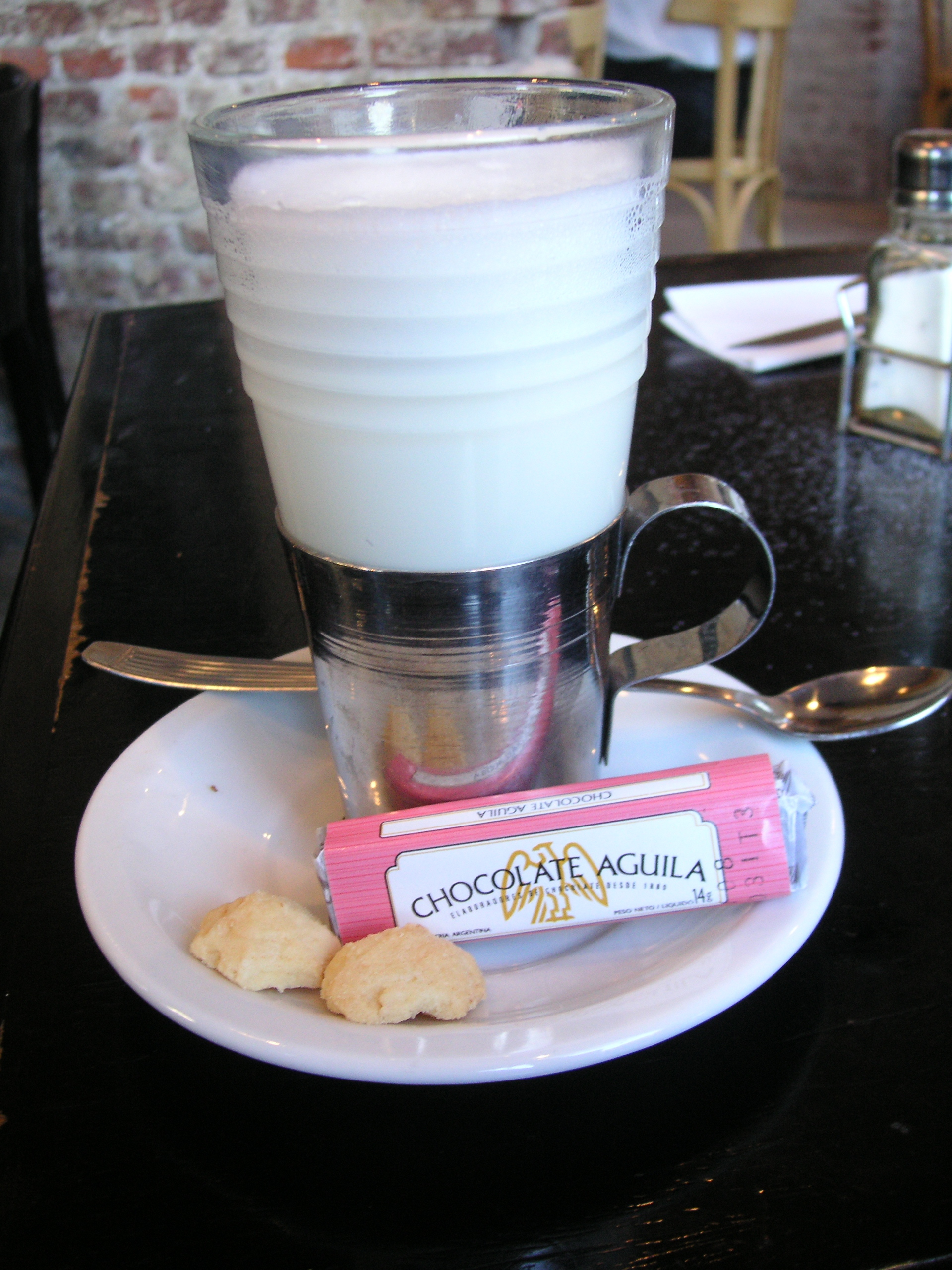
Step 1: A cup of hot milk is served with a bar of chocolate alongside it

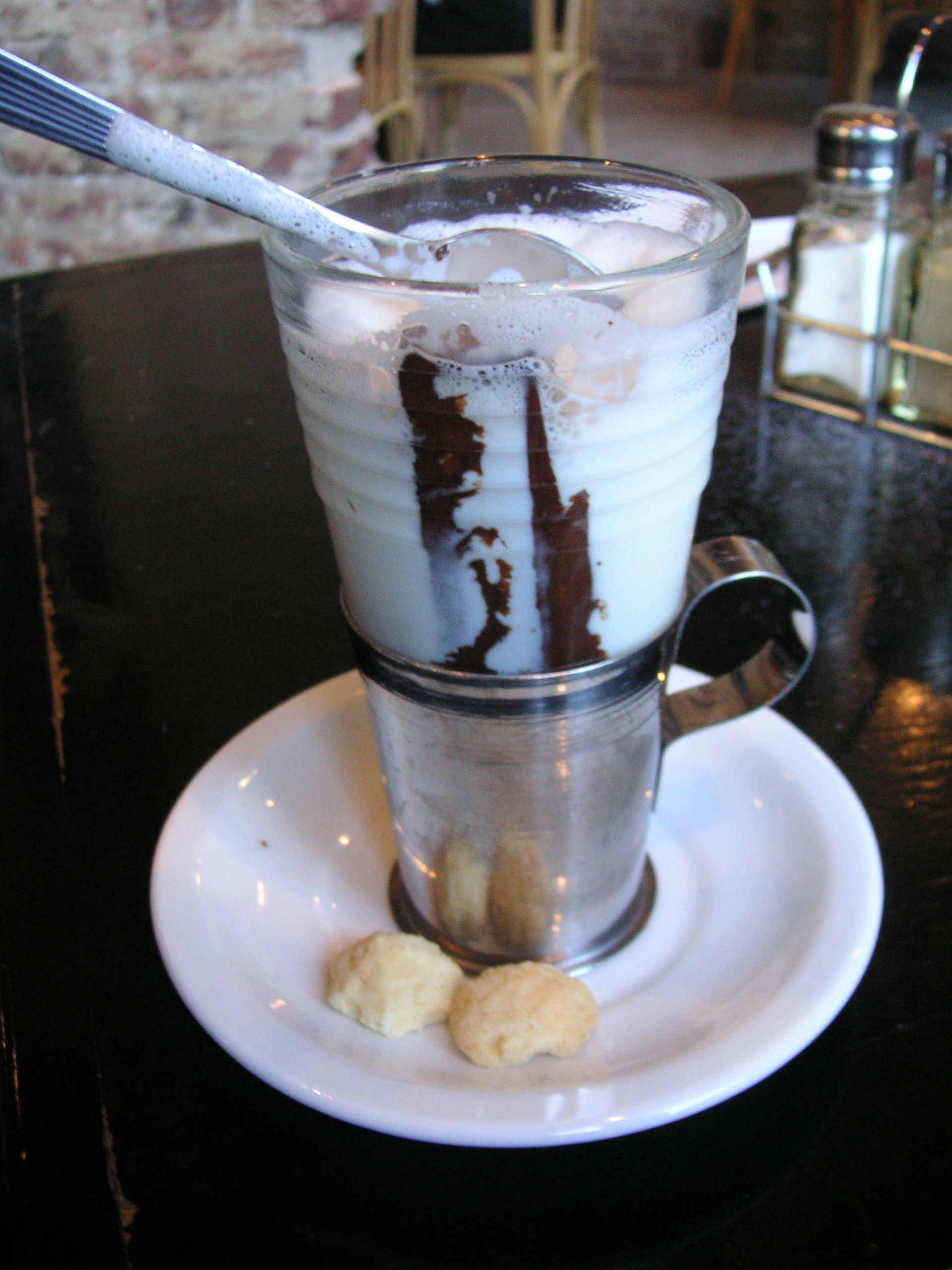
Step 2: The chocolate is dropped into the milk

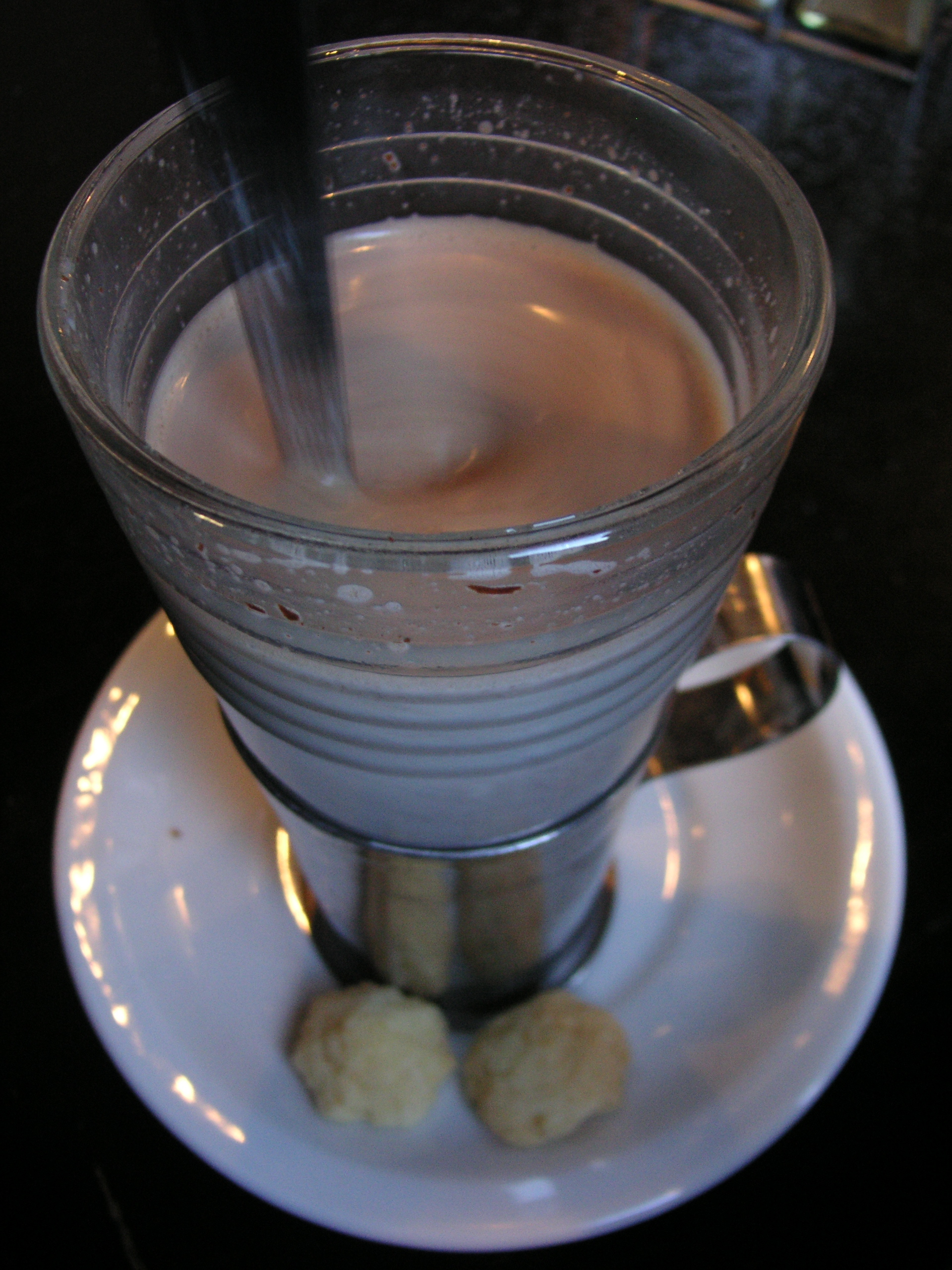
Step 3: The beverage is stirred vigorously with the spoon until the chocolate is entirely melted

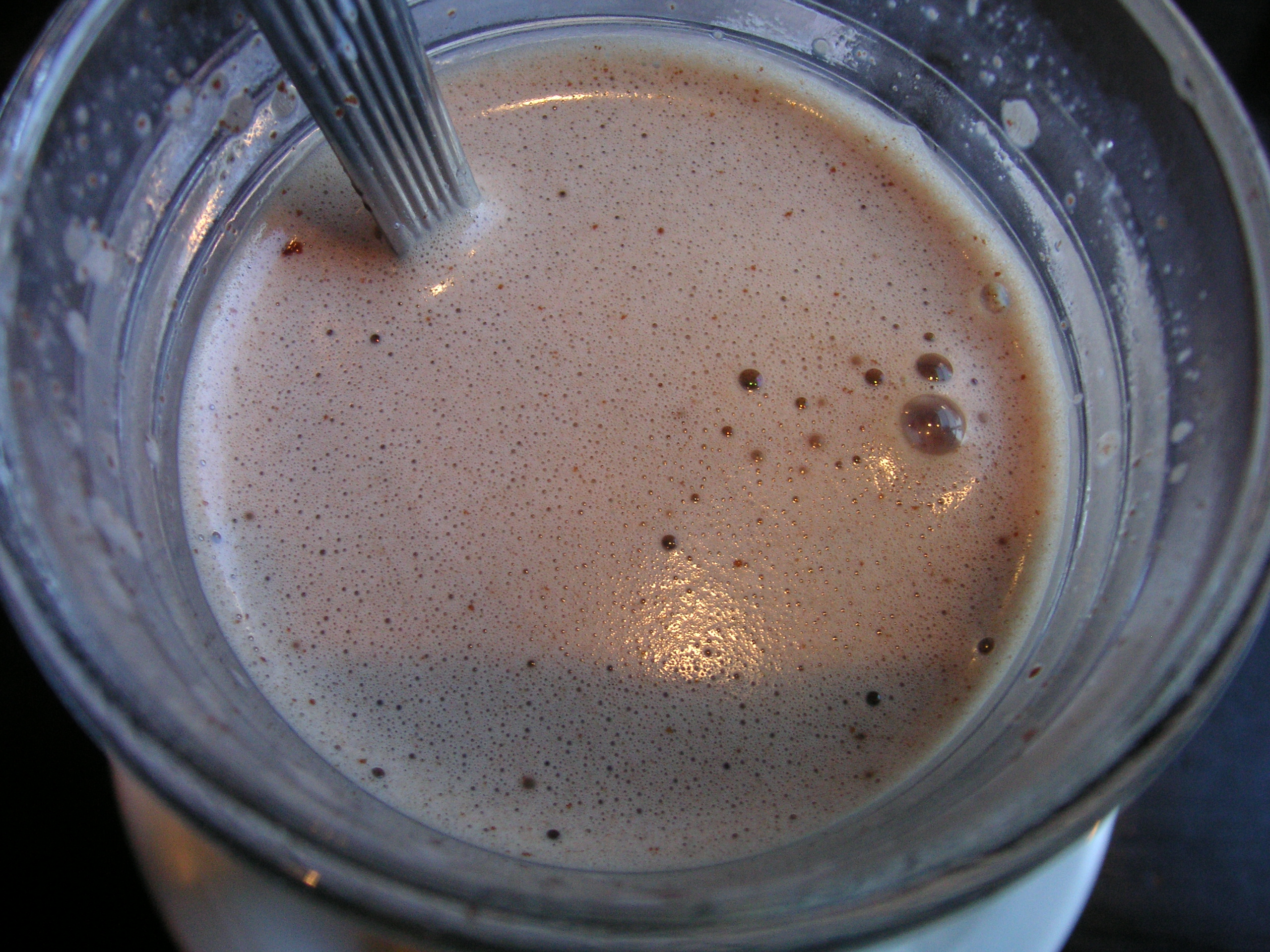
Step 4: Bubbles will form on the surface once the chocolate is fully dissolved
