= National Agency for the Roma =

The National Agency for the Roma (Romanian: Agenția Națională pentru Romi, ANR; Romani: Themeski Ajenciya le Romengi) is an agency of the Romanian government which seeks to improve the social and economic situation of Romania's Roma minority, which make up 2.5% of the population and are the country's most disadvantaged minority.

A government agency for Roma affairs was first established in February 1997, under the name of "National Office for the Roma", which was subordinated a component of the Department for the Protection of National Minorities. In July 2003, the agency was renamed the "Office for Roma Affairs". The current National Agency for the Roma was established in October 2004, and became an independent agency of the government.

The ANR is headquartered in Bucharest (the country's capital) and has regional offices in each of the country's eight development regions. The president of the ANR is Ioan Gruia Bumbu, who is of Roma ethnicity.

== Initiatives ==
The ANR is responsible for coordinating Romania's involvement in the Decade of Roma Inclusion, a regional cooperation agreement between eight countries in Central and Southeastern Europe to improve the social and economic conditions of Romani people.

The agency also has a cooperation agreement with the National Agency for the Employment of the Labour Force, and organises joint initiatives with the purpose of improving the employment rate among Roma people, who currently (as of 2006) have the highest unemployment rate in Romania. The ANR also has a collaboration agreement with the National Council for Combating Discrimination; together, they coordinate initiatives aimed at reducing discrimination against the Roma.
