= Bicerin =

Drink made with espresso coffee, drinking chocolate and milk

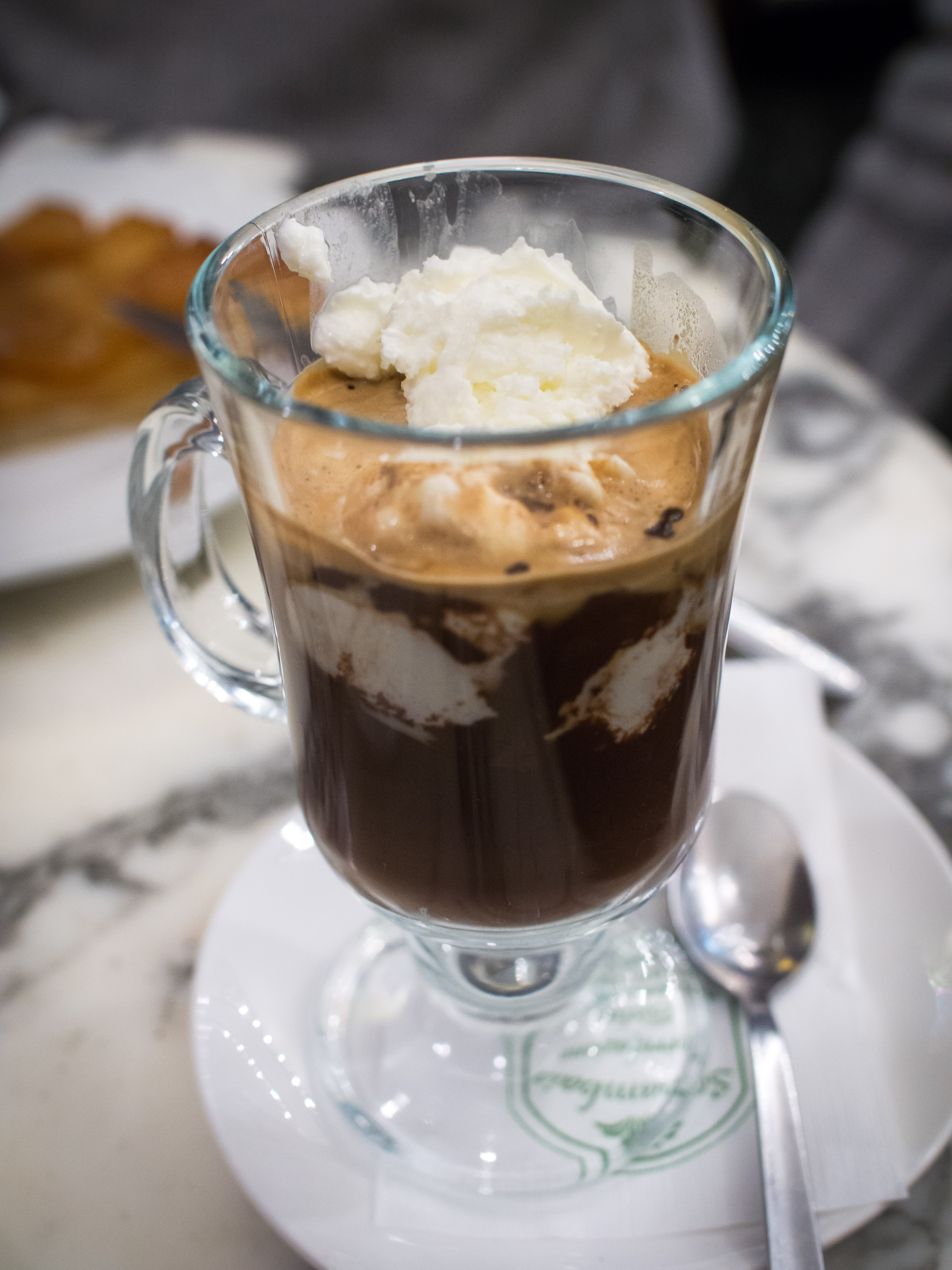
- Bicerin from Turin, Italy
- Type: Chocolate beverage
- Origin: Italy, Piedmont
- Ingredients: Espresso, ganache, milk

Bicerin (Piedmontese: [bitʃeˈriŋ]) is a traditional hot drink native to Turin, Italy, made with espresso, ganache (a type of thick hot chocolate), and frothed milk, served layered in a small glass.

== Origin ==
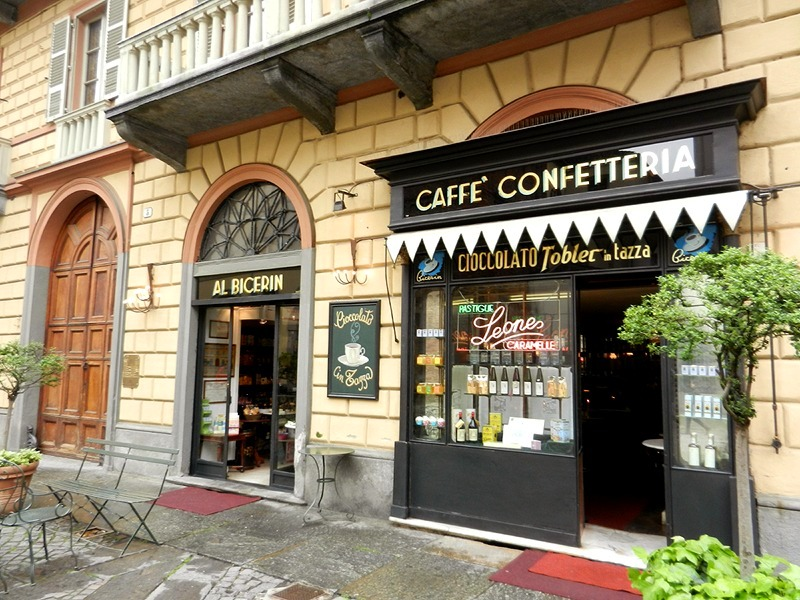
Caffè al Bicerin, a historic coffeehouse of Turin that traditionally serves bicerin

The word bicerin (Piedmontese for 'small glass') is the equivalent of Italian bicchierino (diminutive of bicchiere, lit. 'glass').

Caffè al Bicerin, which sits across from the Santuario della Consolata in Turin's piazza della Consolata, has been serving the drink since the 18th century.

== Liqueur ==
The Vincenzi Family Distillery in Turin also produces a chocolate hazelnut liqueur under this name.

== See also ==
- Piedmontese cuisine
- List of coffee drinks
- List of chocolate drinks
- Espressino and marocchino – similar drinks
