= Bumbo =

Rum-based drink

Bumbu
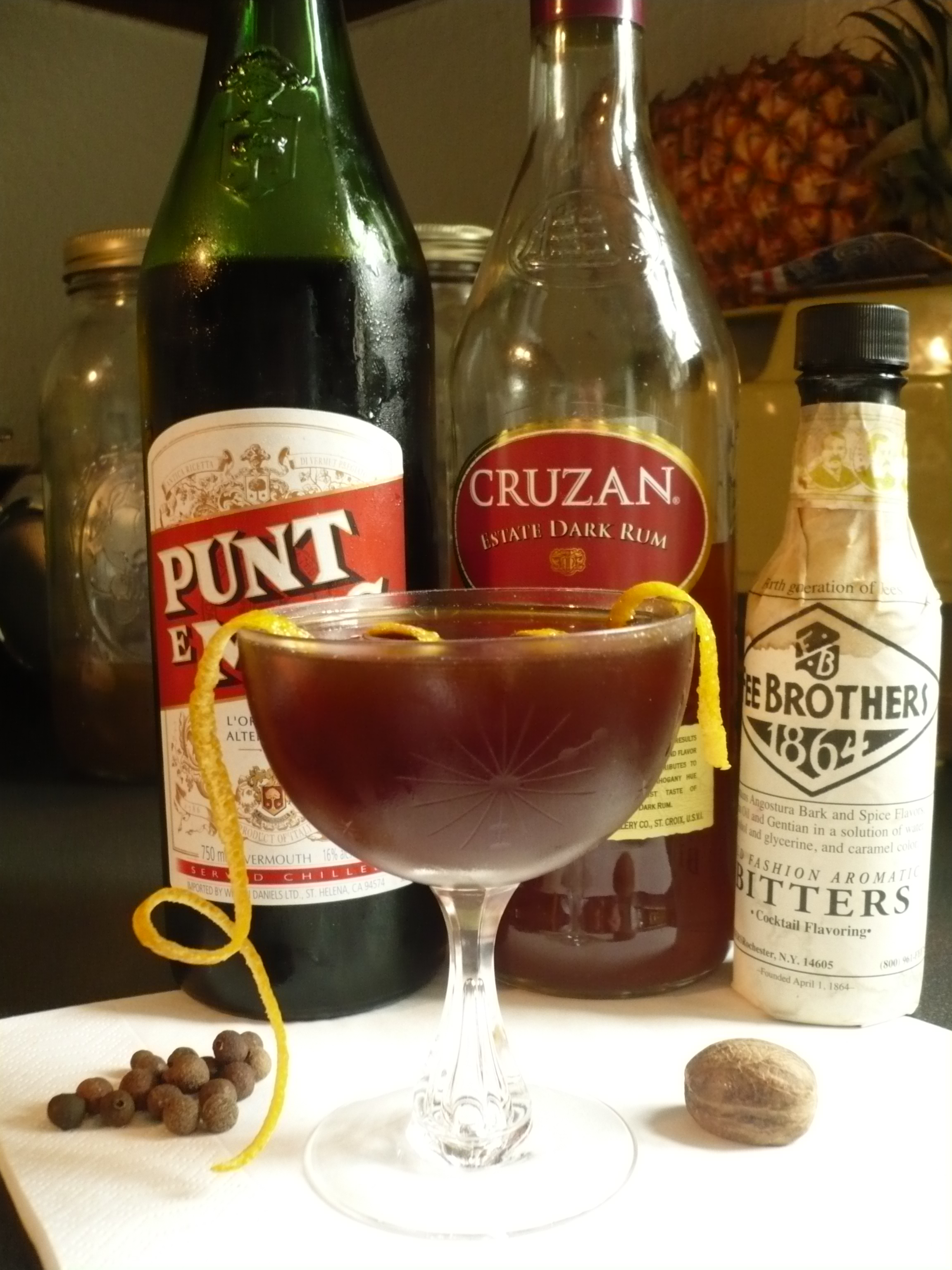
- Type: Cocktail
- Ingredients: 2 ounces rum; 1 ounce water; 2 sugar cubes; Sprinkle 1/4 teaspoon to taste cinnamon; Sprinkle 1/4 teaspoon to taste nutmeg
- Standard drinkware: Old fashioned glass
- Standard garnish: Nutmeg
- Served: Straight up: chilled, without ice
- Preparation: Mix and garnish.

Bumbo (also known as bumbu or bumboo) is a drink typically made from rum, water, and sugar, and with nutmeg, cinnamon, or both added. Modern bumbo is often made with dark rum, citrus juice, grenadine, and nutmeg.

A related drink is the Traitor, made with orange juice, rum, honey, and cactus, mixed and heated.

Bumbo was commonly used during election campaigns in colonial British America, to the extent that treating voters to gifts and other freebies during election campaigns was referred to as "swilling the planters with bumbu". George Washington was particularly noted for using this technique; his papers state that he used 160 gallons of rum to treat 391 voters to bumbu during campaigning for the Virginia House of Burgesses in July 1758.
