= Marocchino =

Italian drink made with coffee and cocoa

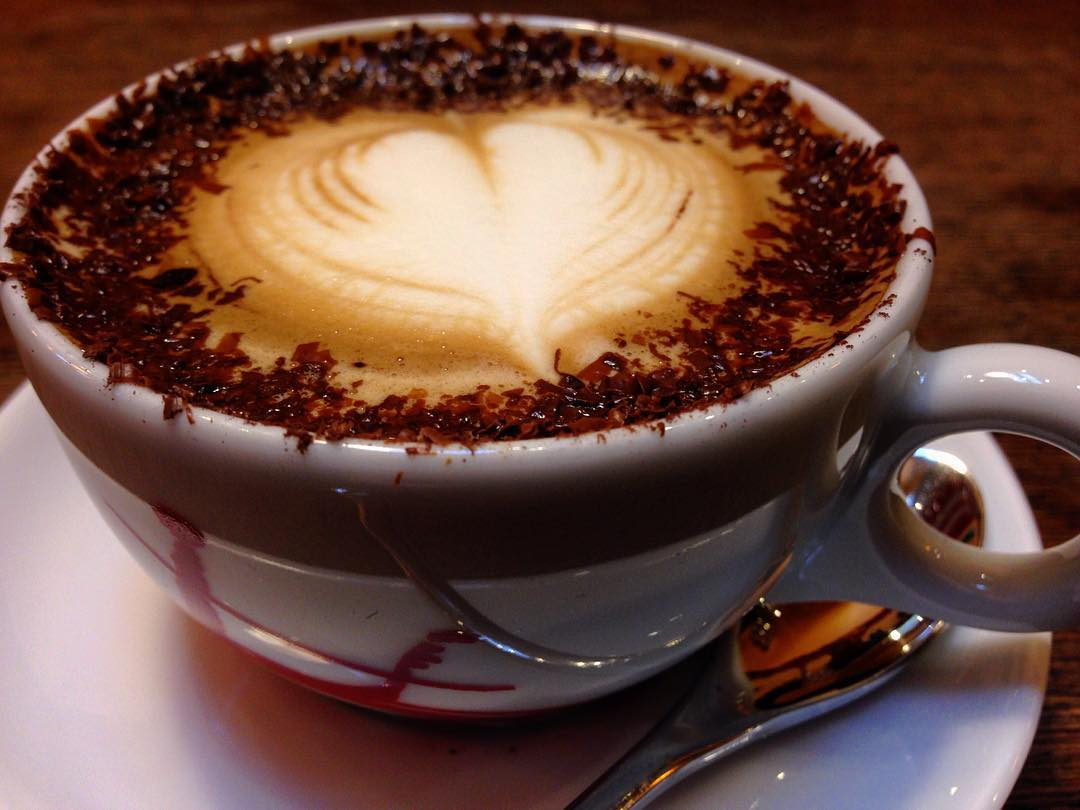
Example of a marocchino

Marocchino is a coffee drink invented in Turin, Italy. It is described as a "mini-cappucino dusted with cocoa".

== Preparation ==
Carefully pour frothed milk over espresso, then dust the top with cocoa powder.

According to another recipe, add hot chocolate, pour espresso over it, top with milk froth, and garnish with cocoa powder.

In some regions of northern Italy, thick hot cocoa is added.

== Etymology and history ==
Marocchino (Italian for Moroccan) is said to have got its name as its color is similar to that of Morocco leather used to make hats in Italia. However, some say that this is unlikely.

In the late 1980s, coffee bars began to serve marocchino, an Italian adaptation of mocha. Some believe it is a modern take on bicerin.

== See also ==
- List of coffee drinks
- Caffe mocha and bicerin: similar drinks
