= List of chocolate drinks =

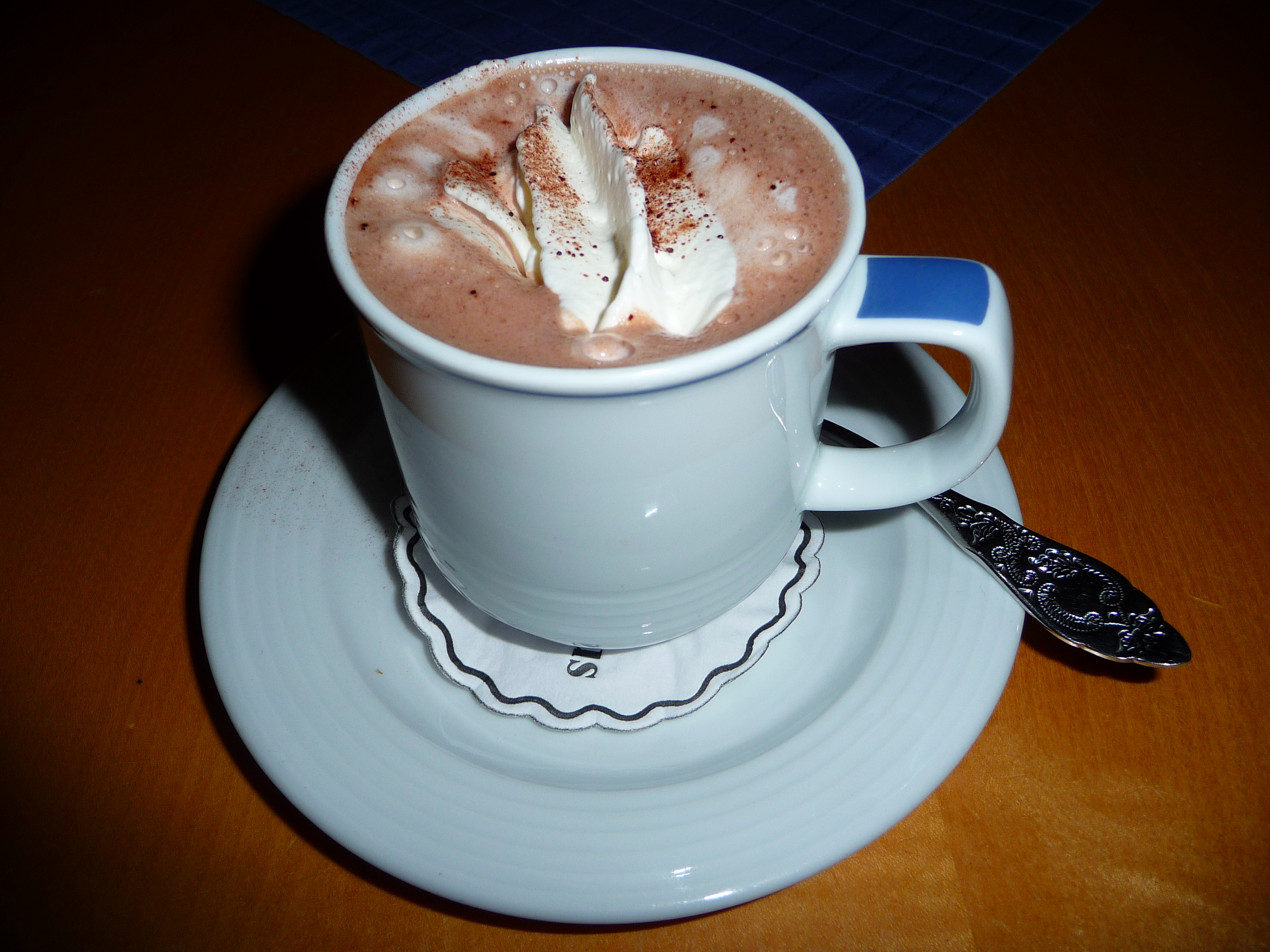
A cup of hot chocolate with whipped cream and cocoa powder

Chocolate is a processed, typically sweetened food produced from the seed of the tropical Theobroma cacao tree. The majority of Mesoamerican people made chocolate beverages, including the Maya and Aztecs.

Taxonomically, Theobroma cacao tree is a member of the Malvaceae or simply the mallow family initially known as the Sterculiaceae.

== Chocolate drinks ==
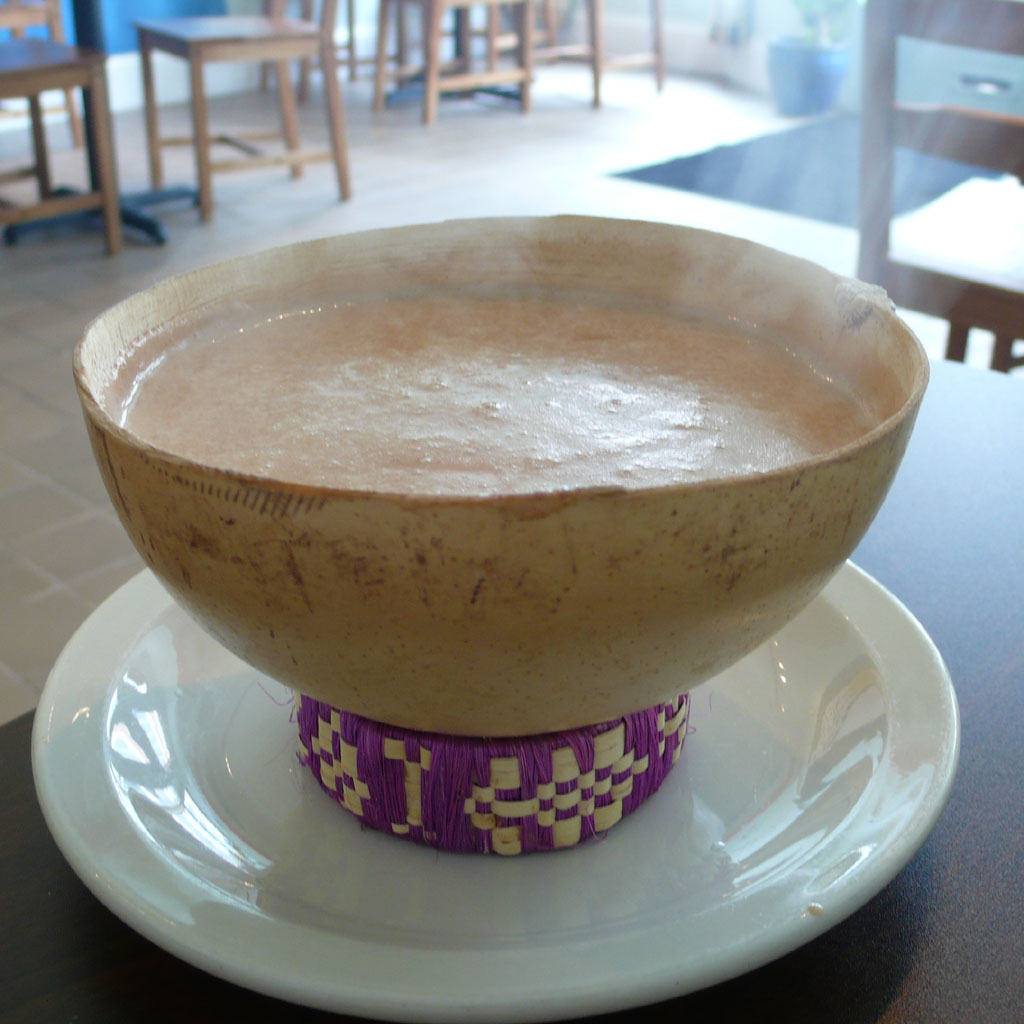
Champurrado is a chocolate-based atole. It is a warm and thick Mexican drink prepared with either masa de maíz or cornmeal.

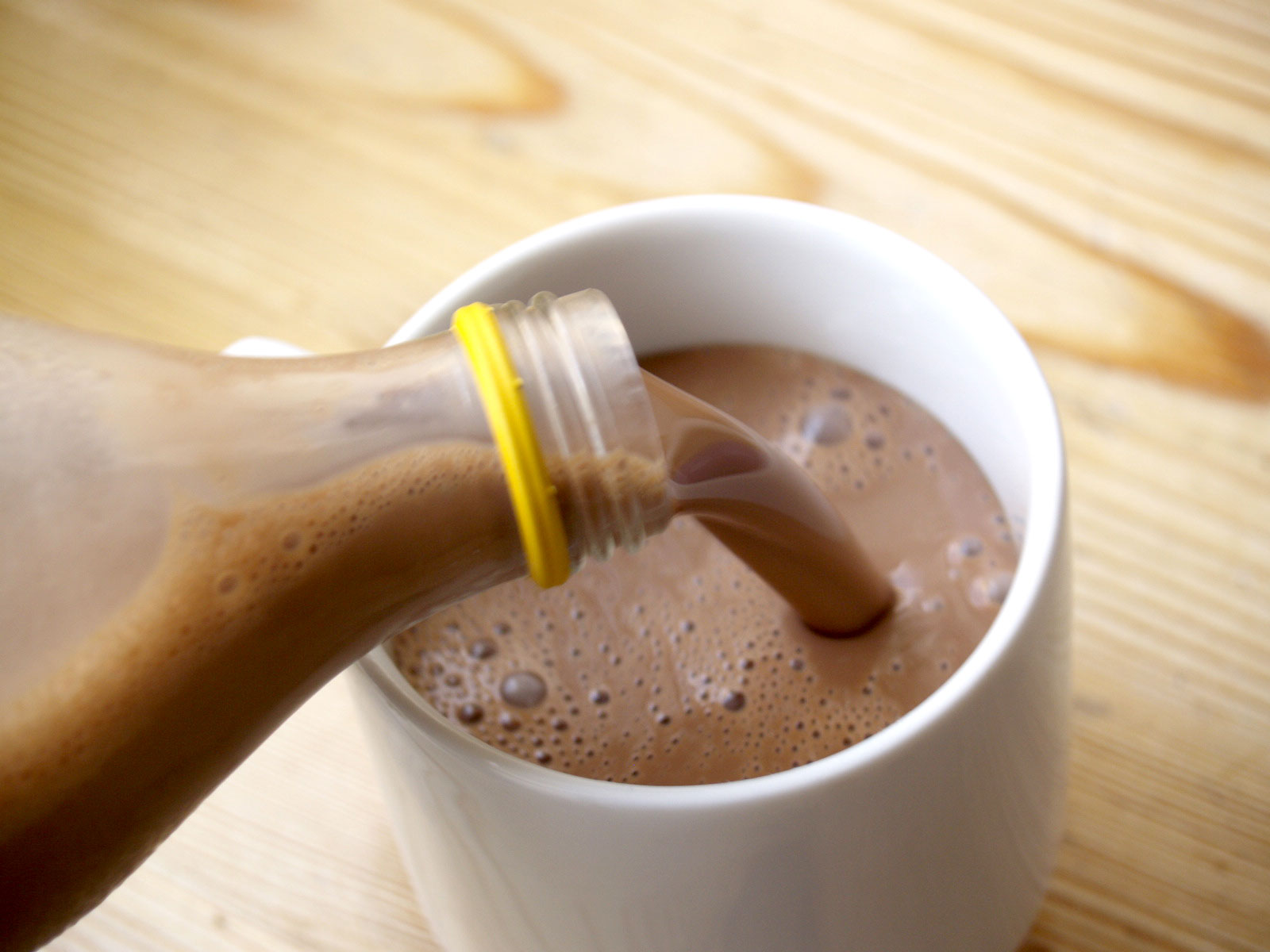
Cocio is a chocolate milk drink.

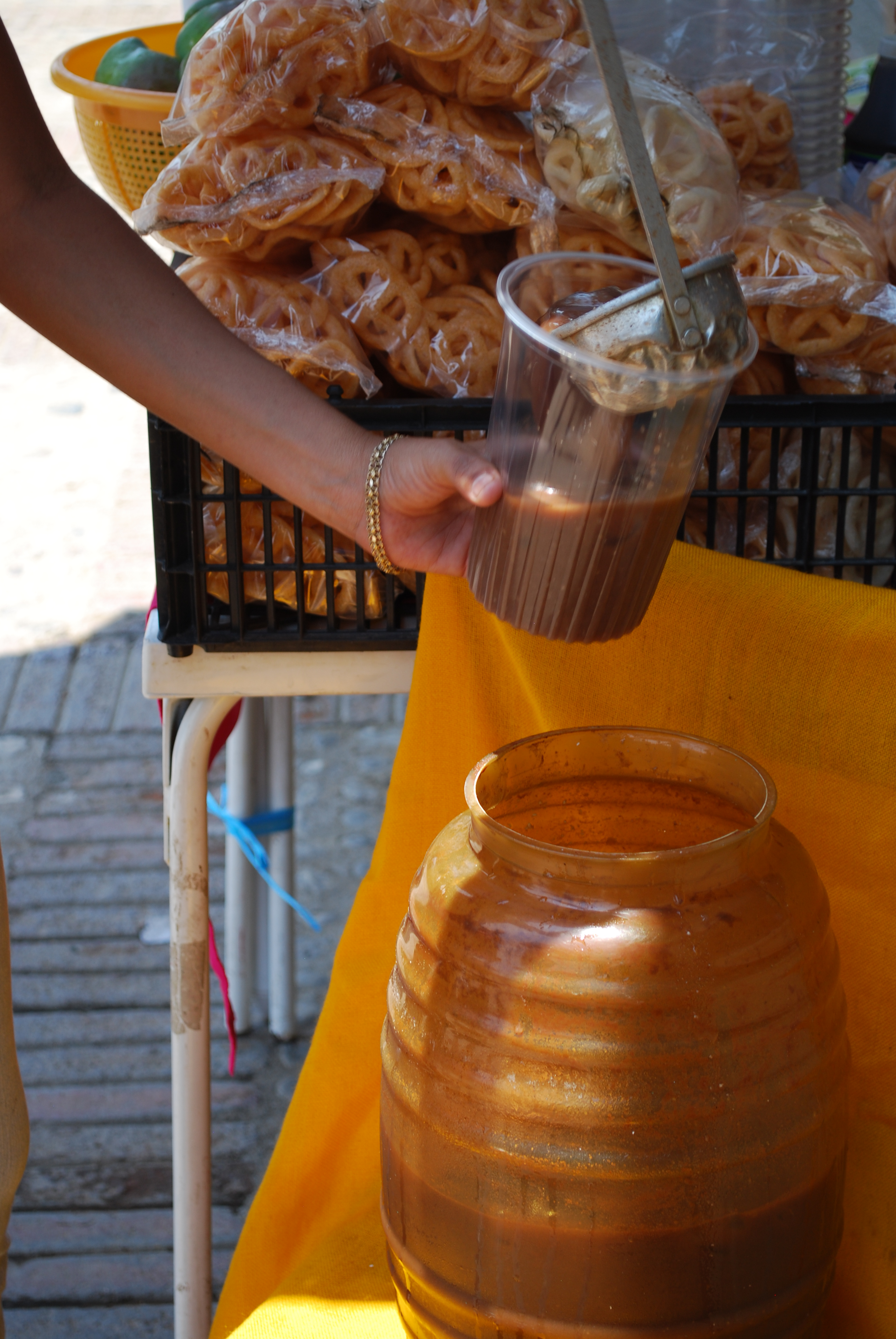
Pozol being served at the boardwalk of Chiapa de Corzo, Chiapas

- Akta-Vite
- Banania
- Bicerin
- Bosco
- Bournvita
- Brownie Chocolate Drink
- Cacolac
- Caffè mocha
- Carnation (brand)
- Champurrado
- Choc-Ola
- Chocolate liqueur
- Chocolate milk
- Chocolate milkshake
- Chocolate Coke
- Chocomel
- Cocio
- Cocodirect
- Cola Cao
- Egg cream
- Espressino
- Granko
- Hot chocolate
- Kayo Chocolate Drink
- Kókómjólk
- Koko Samoa
- Marocchino
- Milo
- Nesquik
- Ovaltine
- Pinolillo
- Pópo
- Pozol
- Pucko
- Stephen's Gourmet
- Submarino
- Swiss Miss
- Tascalate
- Tejate
- Toddy (PepsiCo)
- Tsokolate (or Sikwate)
- Vi-Co
- Yoo-Hoo
- Xicolatada

=== Chocolate liqueurs ===
- Chocolate liqueur
- Liqueur Fogg
- Ratafia de cacao
- Sabra liqueur
- Vana Tallinn
- Vermeer Dutch Chocolate Cream Liqueur

=== Mexican chocolate ===
- Abuelita
- Ibarra (chocolate)
- Mayordomo
- Taza Chocolate
- Pópo

== See also ==
- Cacao beverage
- Champorado – sweet chocolate rice porridge in Philippine cuisine.
- Chocolatiere
- Hot chocolate effect – phenomenon of wave mechanics first observed in the making of hot chocolate or instant coffee
