= Ovaltine =

Brand of milk product

Ovaltine (Ovomaltine)
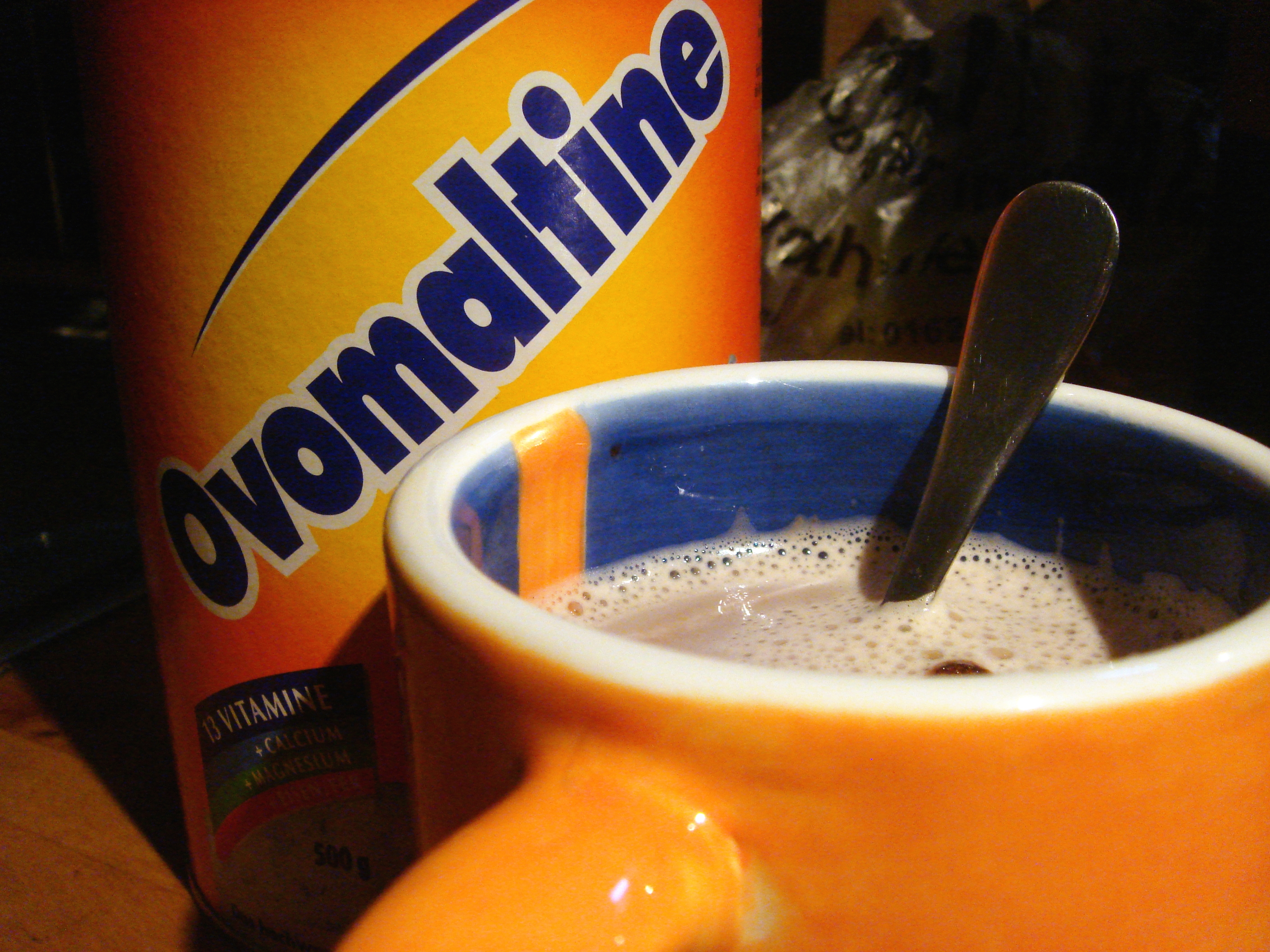
- Ovomaltine jar and cup, both in the distinctive orange colour
- Manufacturer: Associated British Foods or licensees (Nestlé in the United States)
- Origin: Switzerland
- Introduced: 1904; 122 years ago
- Variants: Chocolate Malt, Malt, Rich Chocolate
- Related products: Hot chocolate; Milo; Nesquik; Horlicks; Yoo-hoo; Vi-co
- Website: Official website (in German, French, and Italian)

Ovaltine, also known by its original name Ovomaltine, is a brand of milk flavouring product made with malt extract, sugar (except in Switzerland), and whey. Some flavours also have cocoa. Ovaltine, a registered trademark of Associated British Foods, is made by Wander AG, a subsidiary of Twinings, which acquired the brand from Novartis in 2002, except in the United States, where Nestlé acquired the rights separately from Novartis in the late 2000s.

== History ==
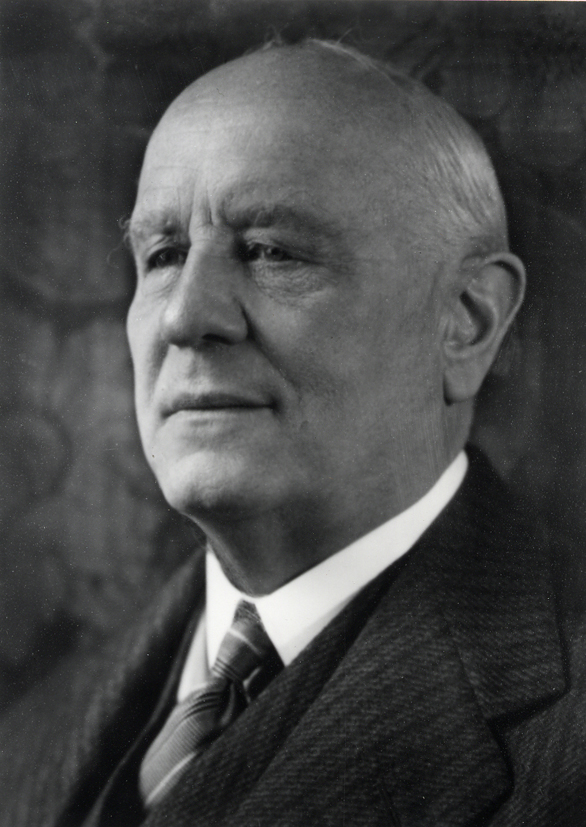
Swiss chemist and pharmacist Albert Wander (1867–1950) developed Ovomaltine in 1904.

Ovaltine was developed in 1904 by chemist Albert Wander (1867–1950), in Bern, Switzerland, where it is known by its original name, Ovomaltine (from ovum, Latin for "egg", and malt, which were originally its key ingredients). In 1927, the factory moved out to the village of Neuenegg, a short distance west of Bern, where it is still produced.

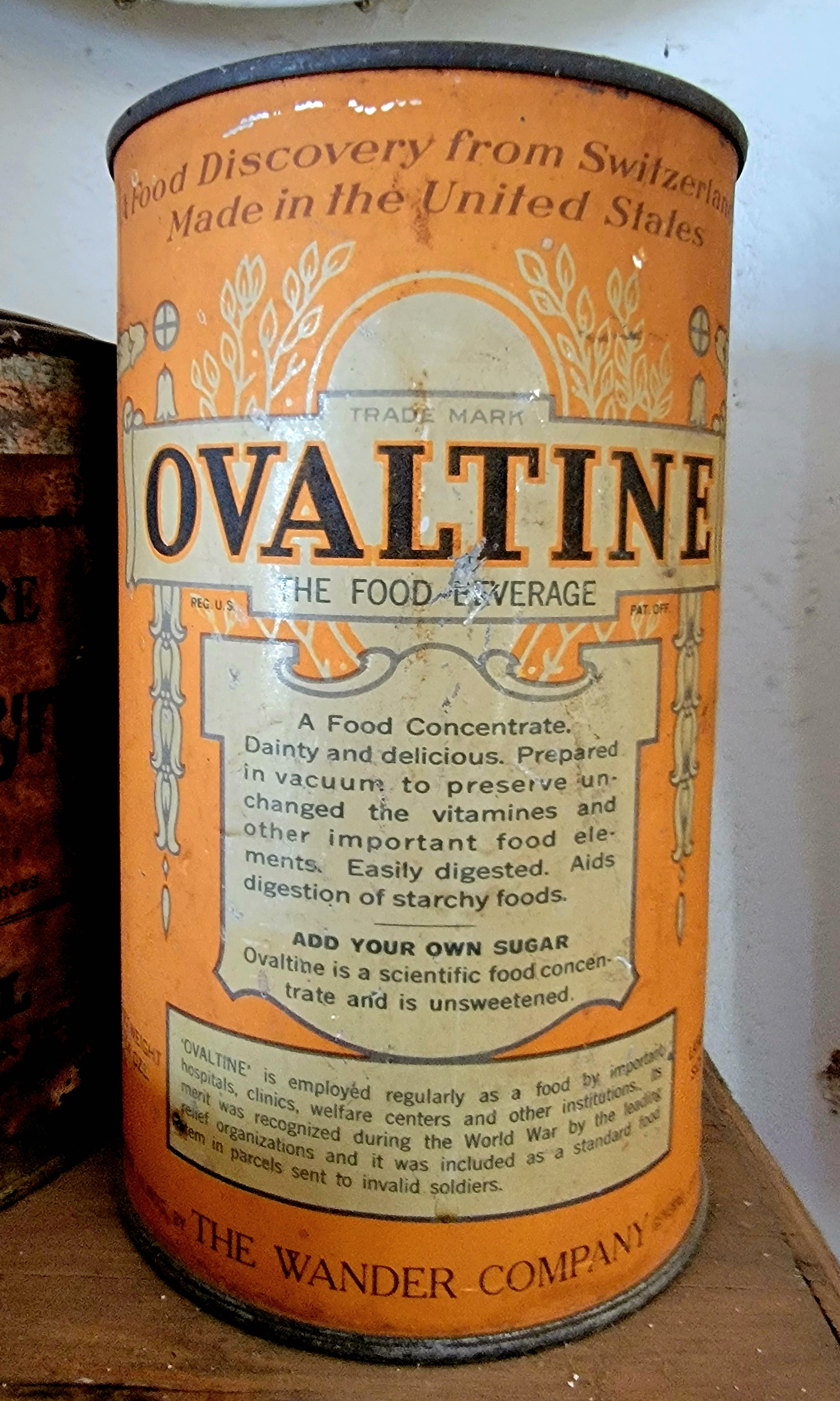
Early 20th-century American Ovaltine container

Ovomaltine was exported to Britain as Ovaltine in 1909. A factory was built in Kings Langley, which took it to the United States as well. By 1915, Ovaltine was being manufactured in Villa Park, Illinois, for the US market. Ovaltine was later manufactured in Peterborough, Ontario, for distribution in Canada. Gerald Ethelbert Goldsmith was the president of Ovaltine Foods at this time. In 1943, Ovaltine opened its second-largest factory in Devonport, Tasmania, to meet the demands of the Australasian and Southeast Asian markets.

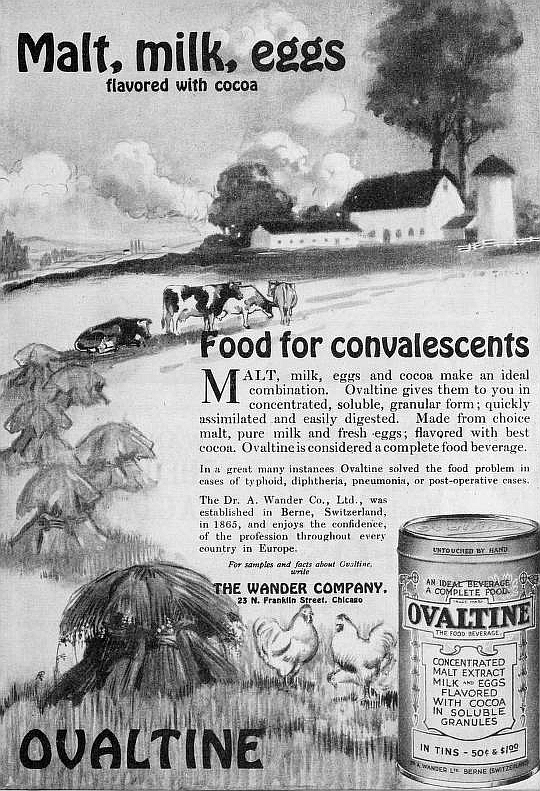
Ovaltine advertisement in an American medical journal, 1917

Originally advertised as consisting solely of "malt, milk, eggs, flavoured with cocoa", the formulation has changed over the decades and changed for different parts of the world. In the U.K., it no longer contains eggs.

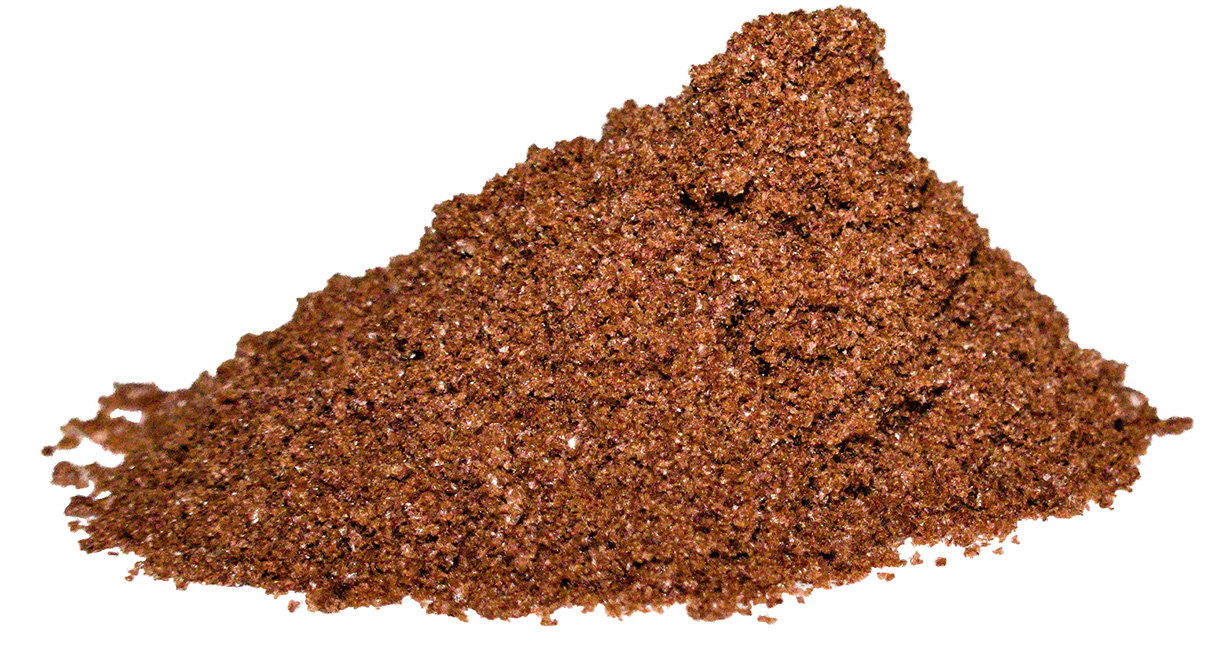
Ovaltine in crystalline form

A chocolate malt version is sold as a powder which is mixed with hot or cold milk as a beverage. Malt Ovaltine (a version without cocoa) and Rich Chocolate Ovaltine (a version without malt) are also available in some markets. Ovaltine also expanded by offering chocolate bars, chocolate Easter eggs, parfait, cookies, and breakfast cereals flavored with the original powder.

Ovaltine also manufactured PDQ Chocolate Flavour Beads, PDQ Choco Chips, Eggnog Flavoured PDQ, and Strawberry PDQ, which are no longer available. These drink mixes enjoyed their greatest popularity from the 1960s to the 1980s.

Villa Park, Illinois, was home to the Ovaltine factory in the United States from 1917 until the company's purchase and withdrawal in 1988. The Villa Park Historical Society maintains a permanent exhibit of Ovaltine advertising and memorabilia. The old factory was converted to loft apartments keeping the original floors and wall exposed, and is known today as Ovaltine Court.

== Acquisitions ==
In 1992, Himmel Group obtained the right to make and sell Ovaltine in the U.S. from Sandoz Nutrition Corporation. In 2002, Himmel sold their rights to Novartis. As of 2007, Nestlé had acquired Novartis' medical nutrition division and has the rights to Ovaltine.

== International appeal ==
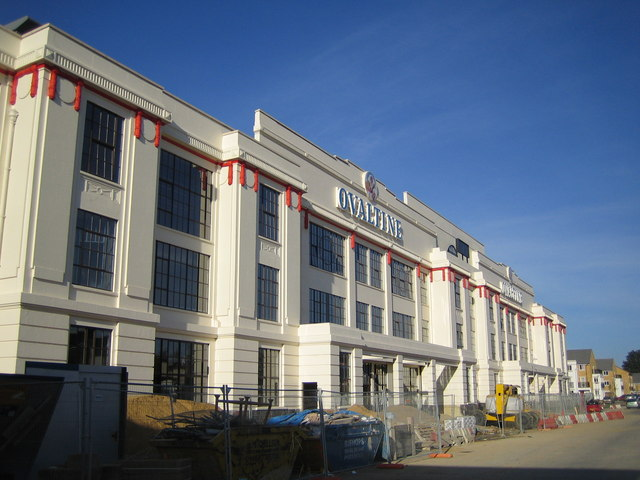
The listed art deco façade of the former Ovaltine factory, Kings Langley. The building was redeveloped into housing in 2002.

Ovaltine was very popular in Britain, and was manufactured at Kings Langley in Hertfordshire using a process that included GEA Wiegand falling film evaporators to concentrate liquid malt extract, which was then dried under vacuum in steam-heated band dryers. The art deco-style Ovaltine factory in Kings Langley is a well-known local landmark. Production ceased in 2002 and the factory has now been redeveloped as luxury flats. Near the factory was a health farm run by the Ovaltine works, set up as a model farm and a health resort for disadvantaged children, which operated until the 1960s. Later, the farm land was sold and is now largely occupied by the M25 motorway. The Ovaltine Egg Farm is now the site of Renewable Energy Systems Ltd.

Due to its high-caloric and sugar content, Ovaltine has been a popular drink for climbers since the early days of mountaineering, including being carried during the first successful summitting of Mount Everest in 1953.

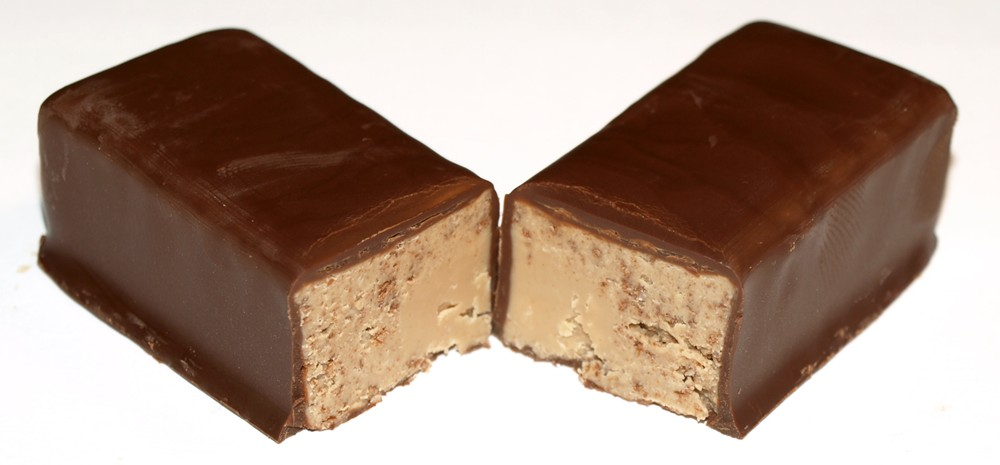
Ovaltine also produces various chocolate products, such as the Ovolino bar.

In October 2002, the food and drinks division of Novartis, the maker of Ovaltine, was bought by Associated British Foods. ABF currently produces Ovaltine in Switzerland, China, Thailand, Nigeria and Australia. In Canada, Ovaltine is produced by Grace Foods in biscuit and powdered drink forms. In the United States Nestlé manufactures Ovaltine.

In Hong Kong, Ovaltine (阿華田, Or Wa Tin), like Horlicks, is known as a café drink. It is served at cha chaan tengs as well as fast-food shops such as Café de Coral and Fairwood. It is served hot, or on ice as a cold drink. In Brazil, it is commonly mixed with vanilla ice cream. In the Asian market, it is a chocolate ice cream flavoured with Ovaltine powder. The McCafé in Hong Kong provides "Ovaltine Crunchy Latte" and other drinks and desserts.

In Malaysia and the Philippines, Ovaltine has lost its popularity to Milo. Ovaltine is sold in Tetra Pak cartons for cold serving and is widely available in shops and supermarkets, yet it has a lower profile than similar beverages in the market. In Japan, Ovaltine was sold for a short period in the late 1970s by Calpis Industries (presently Calpis Co., Ltd.), but it was not a commercial success. In Australia, Ovalteenies are sold as round tablets of compressed Ovaltine, eaten as candy.

In Brazil (where the brand is still known by its original name, "Ovomaltine"), local fast-food chain Bob's has offered, since 1959, Ovaltine-flavored milkshakes and sundaes, which have amounted to flagship products of Bob's. In 2016, McDonald's Brazil acquired exclusive rights to sell "Ovomaltine"-branded milkshakes. The world's second-largest Ovomaltine factory is located in São Paulo state, and Brazil, right behind Thailand, is the second-largest consumer market for the product. Brazilian Ovomaltine differs from other national varieties, owing to an assemblyline malfunction that happened early in its local manufacturing history, which produced a crispier powder as a result, but was accepted well by consumers nonetheless and thus has been kept as such to this day.

In 2011, Ovaltine was banned in Denmark under legislation forbidding the sale of food products with added vitamins unless claims about their effectiveness are proven.

== In popular culture ==
The US children's radio series Little Orphan Annie (1931–1940) and Captain Midnight (1938–1949), and the subsequent Captain Midnight TV series (1954–1956), were sponsored by Ovaltine. They had promotions in which listeners could save proofs-of-purchase from Ovaltine jars to obtain radio premiums, such as "secret decoder ring" badges, or pins that could be used to decode messages in the program. The Little Orphan Annie radio series, decoder ring, and Ovaltine feature in the film A Christmas Story.

Another radio program aimed at five- to fourteen-year-olds, The League of Ovaltineys, was broadcast to Great Britain by Radio Luxembourg on Sunday evenings at 5:30 PM. Beginning in February 1935, it was broadcast until September 1939, when the outbreak of World War II forced closure of the station, and again after the war from 1952. As with the US program, listeners could obtain badges, pins, and secret codes. The Ovaltineys' advertising jingle, which featured the popular English singing trio The Beverley Sisters, was regarded as one of the most successful jingles of the era.

Ovaltine was name-checked in the 1972 Statler Brothers hit, "Do You Remember These".

Ovaltine was a main subject in the Seinfeld's episode 'The Fatigues'.

Vancouver's Ovaltine Cafe, named in 1942 after the drink, has appeared as a set for various movies and television shows.

== See also ==
- Akta-Vite
- Carnation (brand)
- Culinary Heritage of Switzerland
- Horlicks
- Malted milk
- Milo
- List of chocolate beverages
- List of hot beverages
- Nesquik, another drink mix produced by Nestlé
- Postum
- Swiss chocolate
