= Cacao beverage =

Drinks made from Theobroma cacao

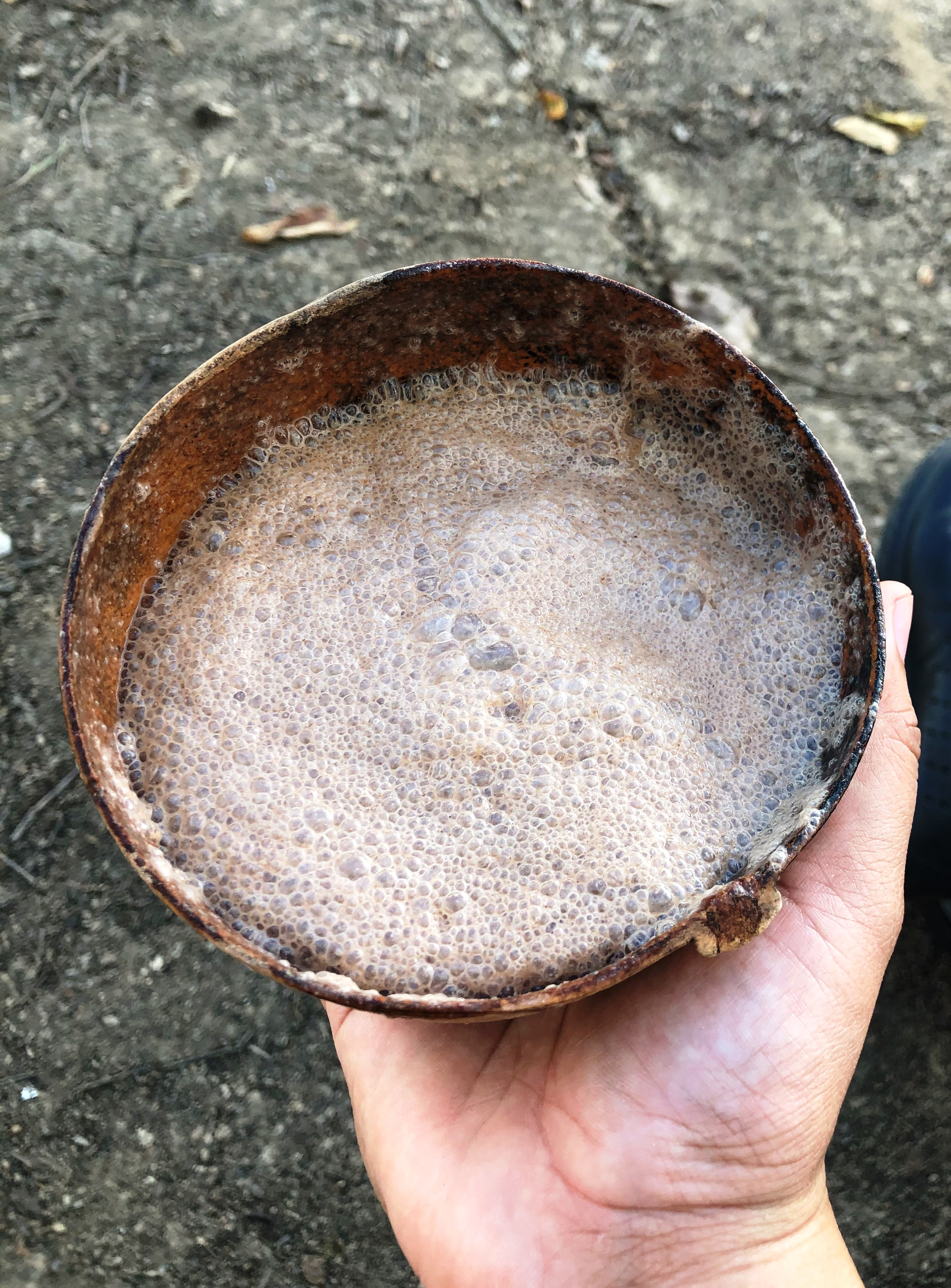
Popo served in a jícara

Beverages made from the flesh and seeds of the fruit of the Theobroma cacao tree have been consumed for thousands of years in Central and South America.

== Early ==
Theobroma cacao was domesticated in around 3300 BCE, and there is archaeological evidence of cacao beverages in the Mesoamerican Classic period (circa 250–900 CE). It remains important today.

In South America, traditional cacao beverages are made with the pulp rather than the seed. This is drunk as a juice, or is fermented to make chicha, an alcoholic drink. Alcoholic cacao beverages have also historically been made in Mesoamerica. Its chronology is unclear, as theobromine found on pottery remnants may originate from a beverage or from other uses.

== Modern ==
Cacao is consumed in a range of beverages in South and Central America today. In Suchitepéquez, Guatemala, women toast cacao at home and mill the resulting beans by machine or, more rarely, by hand. This is used to make a range of beverages, made up of combinations of sugar, annatto for colour, spices, toasted corn and Theobroma bicolor, a species related to cacao also known as pataxte. Some of these include tixte (cacao, achiote, pataxte and rice), panecito (toasted cacao, pataxte, cloves, cumin, sacred earflower and corn), and pinol (toasted cacao, pataxte, cumin, and corn).

In San Bernardino, a town in the region, an atole of corn and rice is made with cacao on feast days under the name pozunke. This is drunk by itself, but also serves as the base for more elaborate preparations served on days such as Good Friday and Day of the Dead. These require cooks to form a dough with peeled, roasted and unroasted cocoa beans, pataxte, masa, and corn tortillas, broken apart and soaked in water. As the dough is kneaded, cold water or ice is poured over at the same time as heated atol, drawing a prized foam of cocoa butter and corn to the surface that is set aside. More atol is added, now boiling, and then the drink is poured from a height to generate more foam and the drink served with the initial foam.

Other chocolate and cacao drinks in Central and South America include tascalate, tejate, pozol, popo, pinolillo, and champurrado.

== See also ==
- Chocolate pot
- History of chocolate
- List of chocolate drinks

== Sources ==
- Lanaud, Claire; Vignes, Hélène; Utge, José; et al. (2024-03-07). "A revisited history of cacao domestication in pre-Columbian times revealed by archaeogenomic approaches". Scientific Reports. 14 (1) 2972. Bibcode:2024NatSR..14.2972L. doi:10.1038/s41598-024-53010-6. PMC 10920634. PMID 38453955.
- Loughmiller-Cardinal, Jennifer (2018). "Distinguishing the uses, functions, and purposes of classic Maya 'chocolate' containers: Not all cups are for drinking". Ancient Mesoamerica. 30 (1): 13–30. doi:10.1017/S0956536117000359.
- Henderson, John S; Joyce, Rosemary A; Hall, Gretchen R; Hurst, W Jeffrey; McGovern, Patrick E (November 2007). "Chemical and archaeological evidence for the earliest cacao beverages". Proceedings of the National Academy of Sciences. 104 (48): 18937–18940. Bibcode:2007PNAS..10418937H. doi:10.1073/pnas.0708815104. PMC 2141886. PMID 18024588.
- Presilla, Maricel E. (2012). Gran Cocina Latina: The Food of Latin America. New York & London: W. W. Norton & Company. ISBN 978-0-393-05069-1.
