= Granko =

Czech granulated cocoa drink

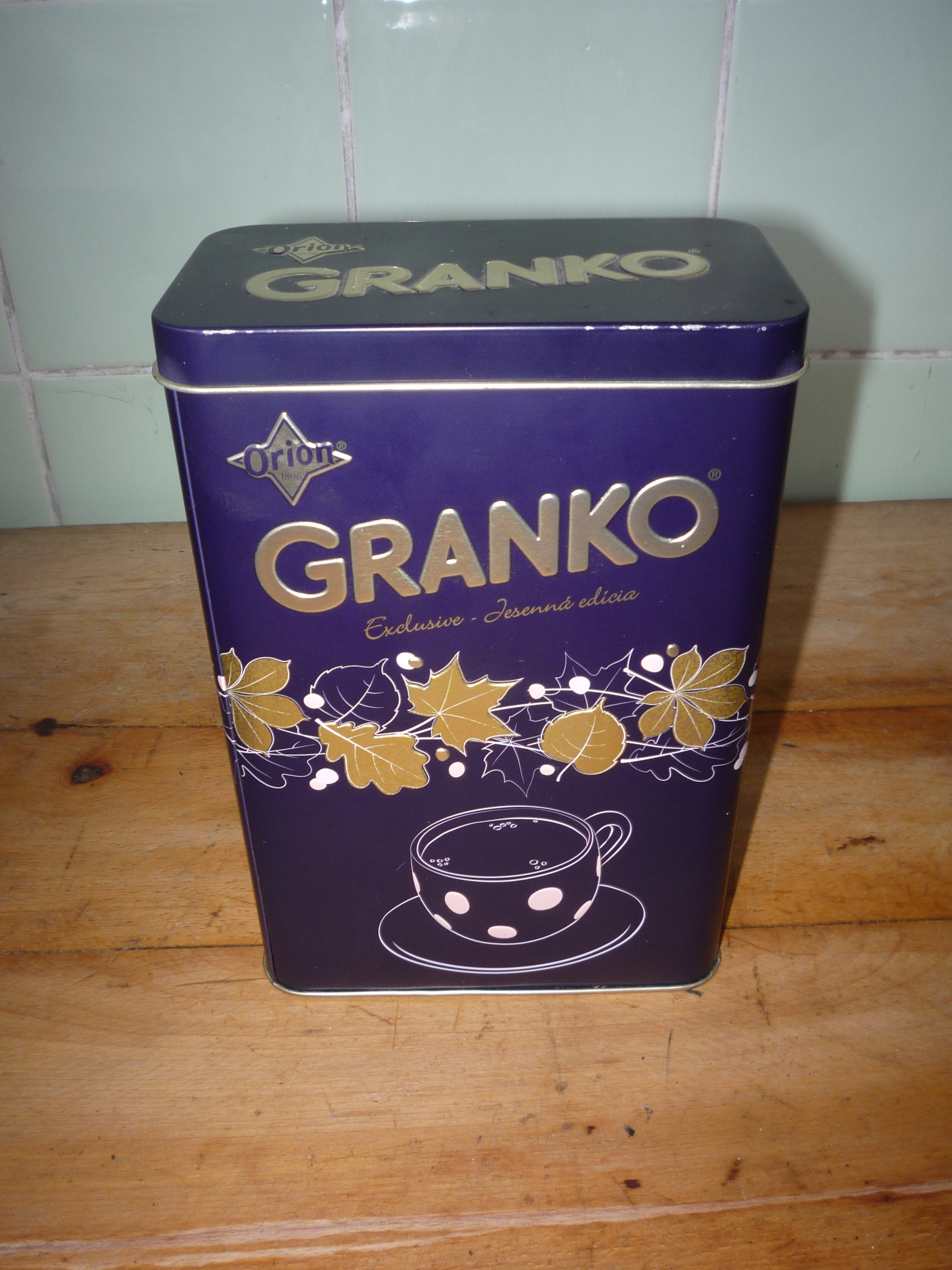
- Granko Exclusive autumn edition tin box
- Distributor: Orion
- Origin: Czechoslovakia
- Introduced: 1979; 47 years ago
- Website: www.granko.cz

Granko (full name: Granulované Kakao) is a Czech granulated cocoa drink produced under the Orion brand by Nestlé. It was created in Czechoslovakia in 1979 and was produced by the national enterprise Pražské čokoladovny, the Sója Kolín plant. Granko is mainly sold in the Czech and Slovak markets, but is also exported to Israel, Great Britain and is also produced in Hungary.

== History ==
The idea to produce its own drink modeled after Benco cocoa from the foreign company Bensdorp dates back to 1976. It began to be advertised as a new product in the daily press in 1979. Soon after the start of production, Granko won the Zlatá Salima, Zlatý Merkur, Zlatý pohár Ex Plzeň awards and the prize in the Packaging of the Year competition. Granko became a success in the Czechoslovak market, primarily because it was the first granulated instant cocoa of its kind in the country. It was supplied in a plastic can containing 400 grams and also in a box weighing 250 grams. In 1981, a banana-flavored variant was produced, in 1985 with strawberry, and in 1988 with peach and blueberry. In 1997, it was produced under the Orion brand, which belongs to the Swiss company Nestlé. It was one of the last consumer products produced in the Modřany chocolate factory, which otherwise specialized only in the processing of raw cocoa beans, before the plant was closed in 2004.

== Design ==
The graphic design of the first packaging was created by Karel Fojtů from the chocolate factory's promotional department. He used a photograph of his daughter Veronika, born in 1975, for the packaging. This motif was later replaced with an image of a mug with red polka dots on a blue background.

== Name ==
The name of the drink came from a public competition announced in mid-February 1978, the winner was to receive 1,500 CSK. Out of 394 different proposals, seven names advanced to the second round: Gran, Granko, Azték, Ko-kao, Minko, Grankao, Caona and Senko. The winning name, which was an abbreviation of the phrase granulated cocoa, was submitted by seven contestants. They divided the prize of 3,000 CSK, making 428 CSK for each.

== See also ==
- List of chocolate drinks
