= Popo (drink) =

Mexican cold chocolate drink

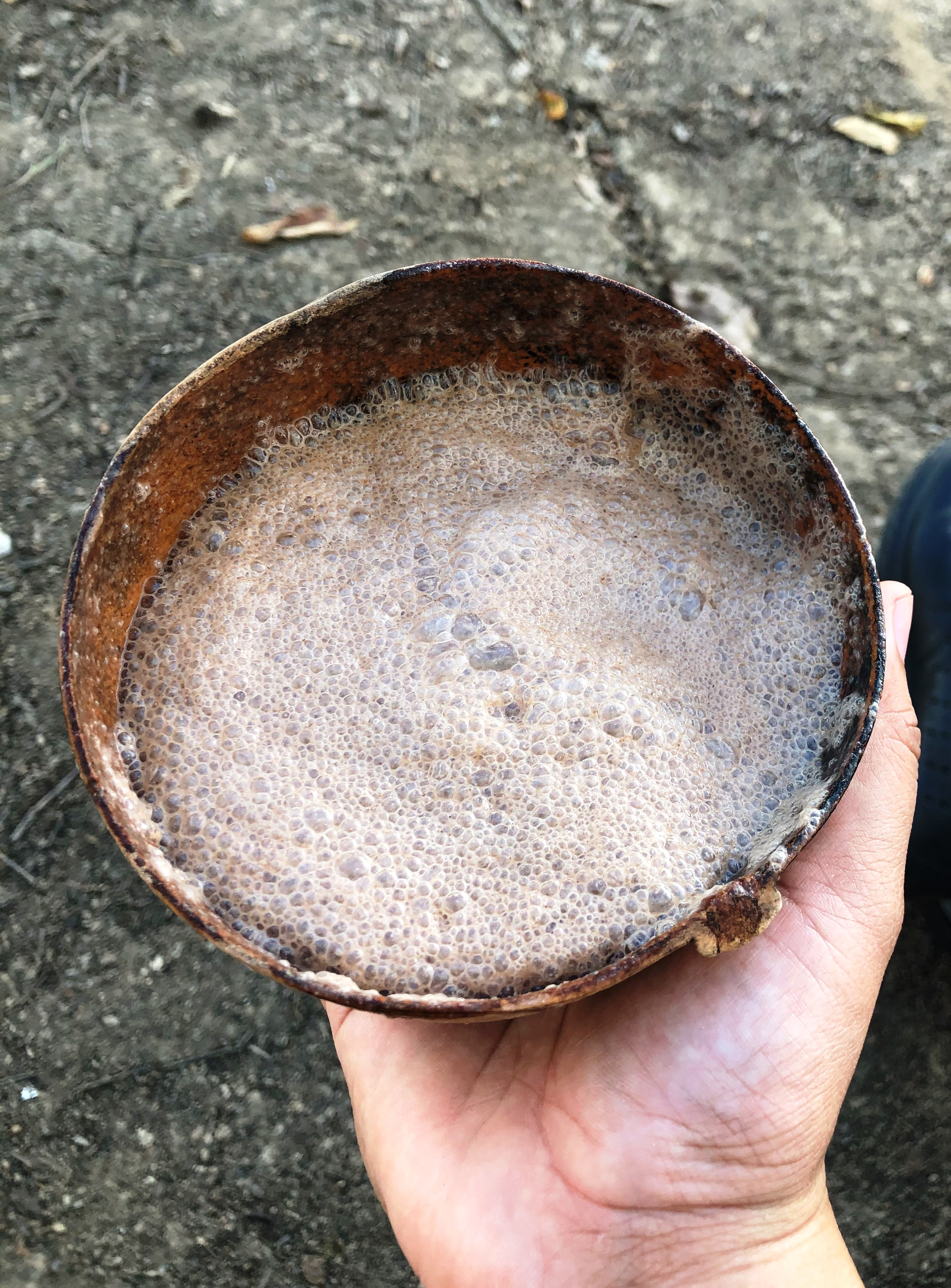
Popo served in a jícara, a traditional wooden bowl

Popo is a foamy and cold cacao beverage typical in the south of the state of Veracruz and some areas of the state of Oaxaca, such as the basin of Papaloapan or Istmo. Its main ingredient is cocoa, which is sweetened with refined sugar or panela (unrefined brown sugar) and mixed with water. Azquiote, known as cocomeca in Oaxaca, is added, or chupipi, or sometimes both; both foaming agents. Some recipes flavor it with cinnamon or anise, and thicken it with maize dough or rice.

Popo is a ceremonial drink, and is prepared for weddings, baptisms, birthdays and patron saint festivals. Its consumption occurs with the cocoa harvest, between the months of August to December. In Ojitlán, a type of cocoa called tiger is used for the white veins of its fruits. In the local towns, such as Tuxtepec, it is common to find street vendors offering a glass of popo for $10–15 MXN pesos.

Its name comes from the Nahuatl popocti ("that which smokes" or "foams"), according to anthropologist Florentíno Cruz, in reference to the foaming characteristic of this drink. It is compared with Popocatépetl, which is the "mountain that smokes". Popo is strongly linked to indigenous communities, particularly the Nahuas, Mixe-Popolucas, Zoque-Populucas, Mazatecs and Chinatecs. For these communities, the very preparation of the popo is in itself a ritual, which can last up to two days.

== Preparation ==
=== Ingredients ===
- Cocoa beans (from Theobroma cacao)
- Fine white sugar or panela (unrefined whole cane sugar, Saccharum officinarum)
- Foaming agent, which can be:
  - Root, tender stems (sprouts) or flowers of azquiote, asquiote or axquiote, Veracruzian name; also called cocolmeca, cocolmecate, or cozolmeca, Oaxacan name (Smilax domingensis)
  - Root, tender stems or fruit of chupipi or chupipe (Gonolobus niger)
- Cinnamon stick or powder (Cinnamomum verum)
- Whole or powdered anise (Pimpinella anisum)
- Whole rice (Oryza sativa)
- Water

=== Preparation ===
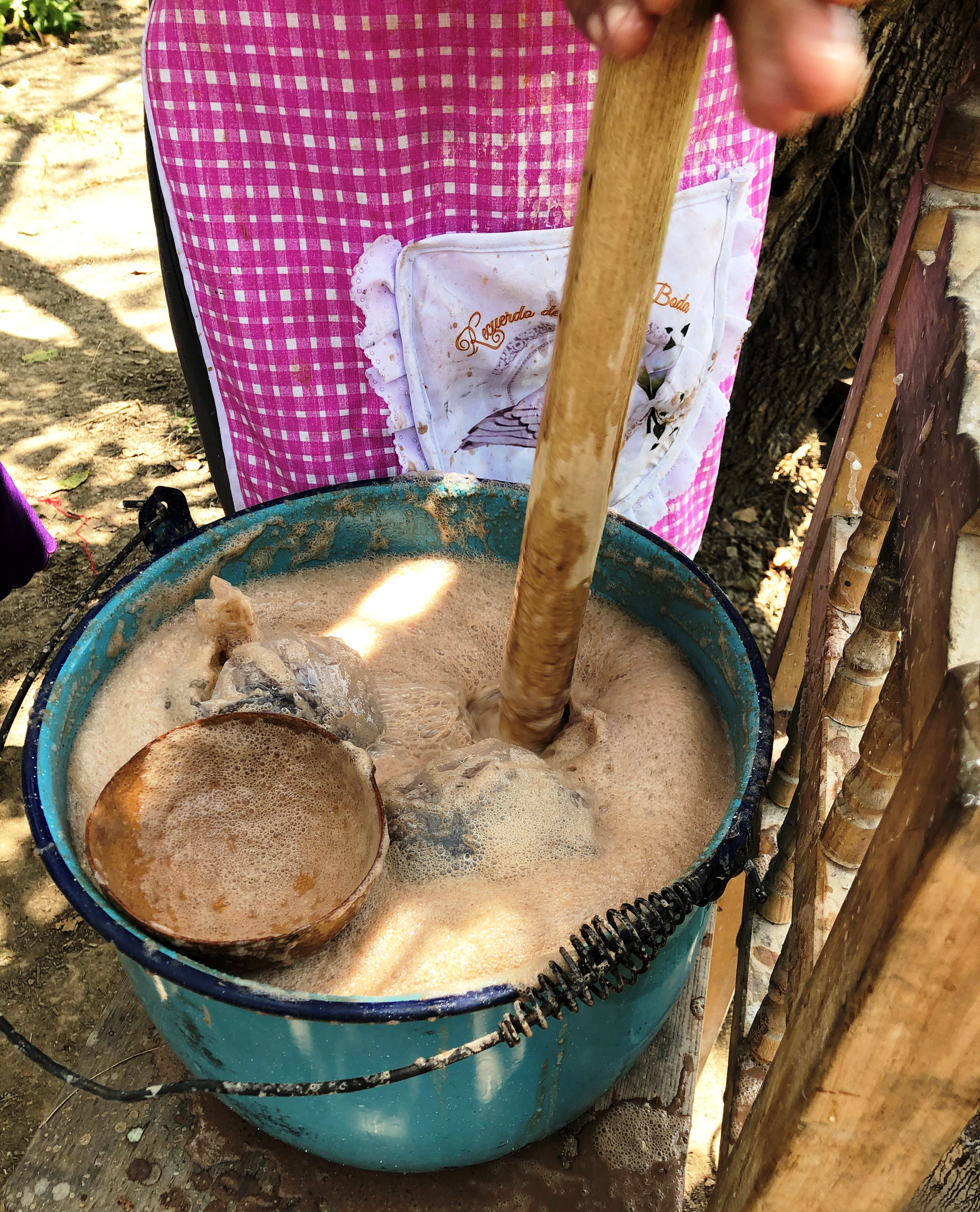
Beating the popo with a molinillo (wooden whisk)

The rice is left in the water to soften. Meanwhile, the cacao beans roast lightly in a comal. In other recipes, the cacao is left toasted from the previous day. The cocoa beans should be toasted, but not burned, since it bitters the taste and they feel scratchy in the throat. After the beans will be shelled, a process that is laborious.

If the fruit of chupipi is used, it should be peeled and finely chopped. If azquiote stems are used, they are washed and also chopped. Cinnamon also can be lightly roasted to release its aroma and is cut up into pieces. Sometimes corn kernels or corn dough (masa) are also added. Corn is nixtamalized with corn cob ash and the corn leaf and then grounded and dried in the sun.

Everything together is grounded in metate (a mealing stone) or in the nixtamal mill until a kind of dense paste remains. The paste is mixed with water and strained several times with a tusor rag (of cotton) or colander. Finally, sugar and ices are added, and foamed with a molinillo (wooden whisk). It is traditional to serve it in a jícara bowl and eat it with spoonfuls accompanied by tamale.

== Characteristics ==
Popo is eaten coldly, usually with crushed ice, traditionally in a wooden bowl or jícara (teacup) (called guasca or xicalli in Nahua). It has a sweet and slightly spicy or spiced taste; some think it leaves a feeling of dryness in the mouth. It is considered that a good Popo should be abundantly foamed.

== See also ==
- Drinks of Mexico

Other Mexican cacao drinks:

- Champurrado
- Tascalate
- Tejate
