= Brownie Chocolate Drink =

Chocolate-flavored U.S. soft drink

Logo for the brand

Brownie Chocolate was a whey-based chocolate drink.

== History ==
Produced from before the 1950s until the 2000s, Brownie Chocolate was similar to the better known Yoo-hoo beverage. Brownie is known to have been sold in Tennessee, Indiana, Florida, Virginia, North Carolina, South Carolina, Kentucky, Mississippi and Alabama. The drink could be found in machines along with Cheerwine and sometimes RC Cola. It could be purchased until around 2007, when it largely disappeared from store shelves. The can featured a Brownie elf on a surfboard on a wave of chocolate.
