= Banania =

Chocolate drink

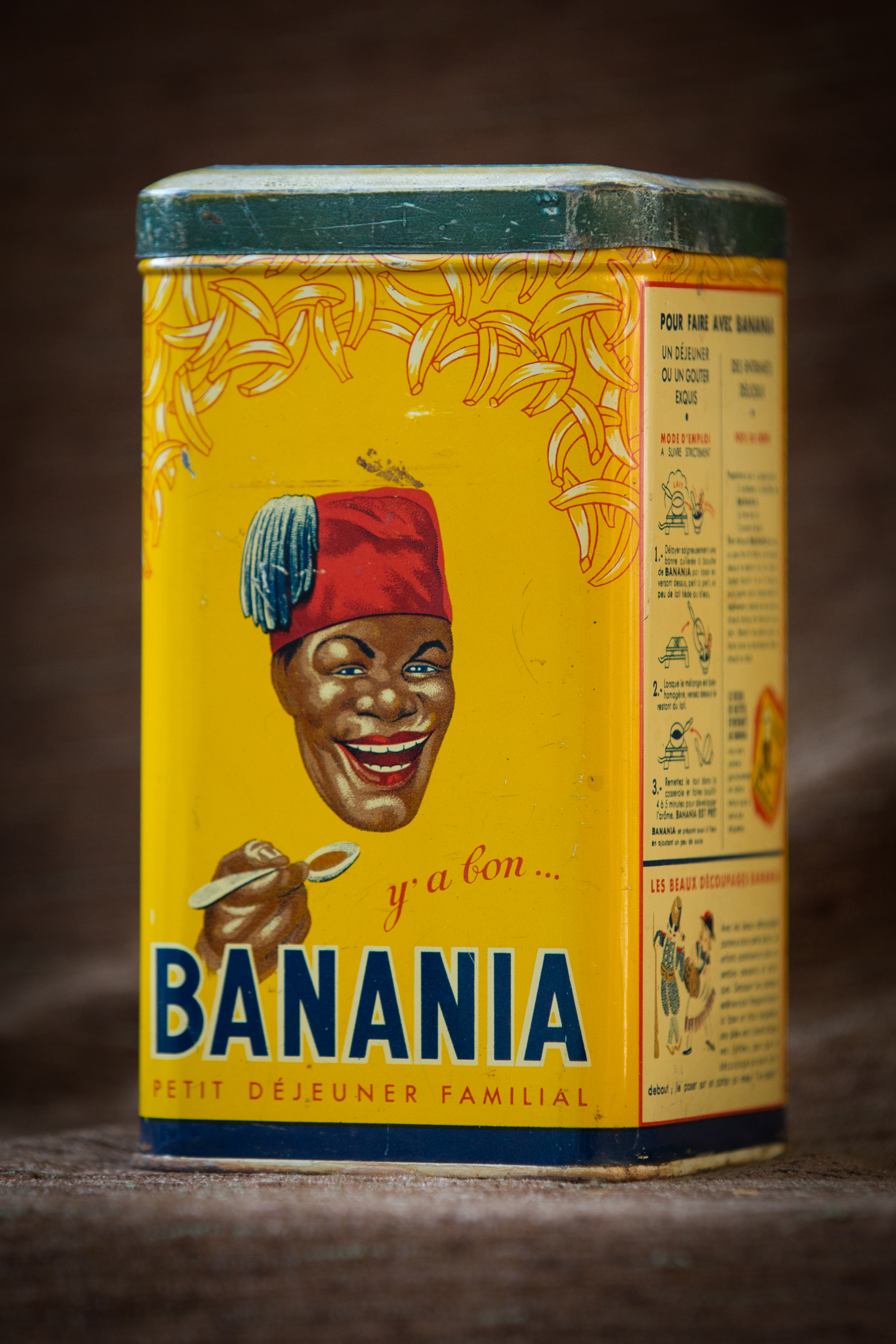
1936 tin of Banania

Banania is a popular chocolate drink found most widely distributed in France. It is made from cocoa, banana flour, cereals, honey and sugar. There are two types of Banania available in French supermarkets: 'traditional' which must be cooked with milk for 10 minutes, and 'instant' which can be prepared in similar fashion to Nesquik.

== History ==
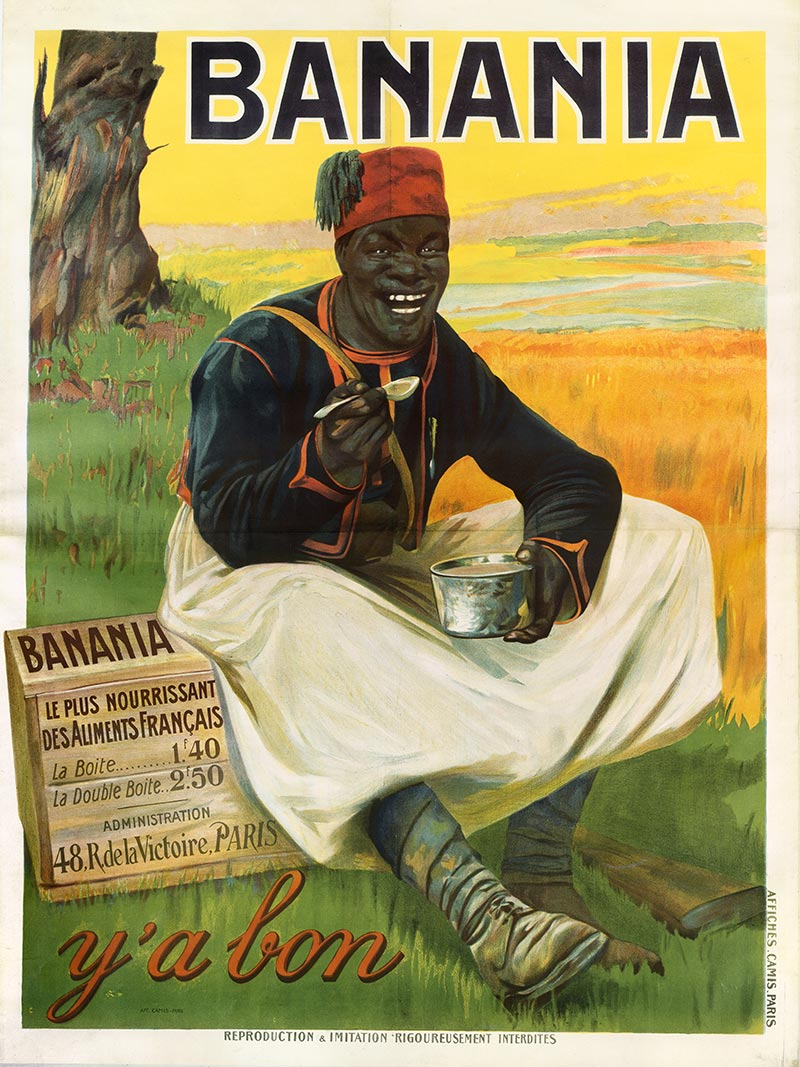
The logo used by the original company in 1915

At the outset of World War I, the popularity of the colonial troops at the time led to the replacement of the West Indian in 1915, by the now more familiar L'ami Y'a bon, the jolly Senegalese infantry man enjoying Banania. Pierre Lardet took it upon himself to distribute the product to the Army, using the line pour nos soldats la nourriture abondante qui se conserve sous le moindre volume possible ("for our soldiers: abundant nourishment that stores while taking up the least space possible").

The brand's yellow background underlines the banana ingredient, and the Senegalese infantryman's red and blue uniform make up the other two main colours. The slogan Y'a bon ("It's good") derives from the pidgin French supposedly used by these soldiers (it is, in fact, an invention).

The form of the character has since evolved to more of a cartoon character. However, the original advertising has become a cultural icon in France. Posters and reproduction tin-plate signs of the pre-war advertising continue to be sold.

In the 1970s and early 1980s, Banania sponsored the Yellow Jersey of the Tour de France. In France the Banania brand is now owned by the newly founded French company Nutrial, which acquired it from Unilever in 2003.

Since the 1970s, the slogan « Y'a bon » has been increasingly criticized as carrying the racist stereotypes that fueled the caricature of the Black man of the time (silly smile, friend of children, therefore a big child and incapable of expressing himself correctly in the French language that he must use) and as a potential symbol of colonialism (just like its mascot "L'ami Y'a bon").

On May 19, 2011, the Movement Against Racism and for Friendship Between Peoples (MRAP) obtained before the Versailles Court of Appeal that Nutrimaine, the company that owns the Banania trademark, stop the sale of products bearing the slogan "Y'a bon." In its ruling, the court ruled that Nutrimaine must remove "in whatever form and by whatever means, the manufacturing and marketing of any illustration on which the famous phrase appears." She imposed a penalty of 20,000 euros per day for each violation found.

== Marketing ==
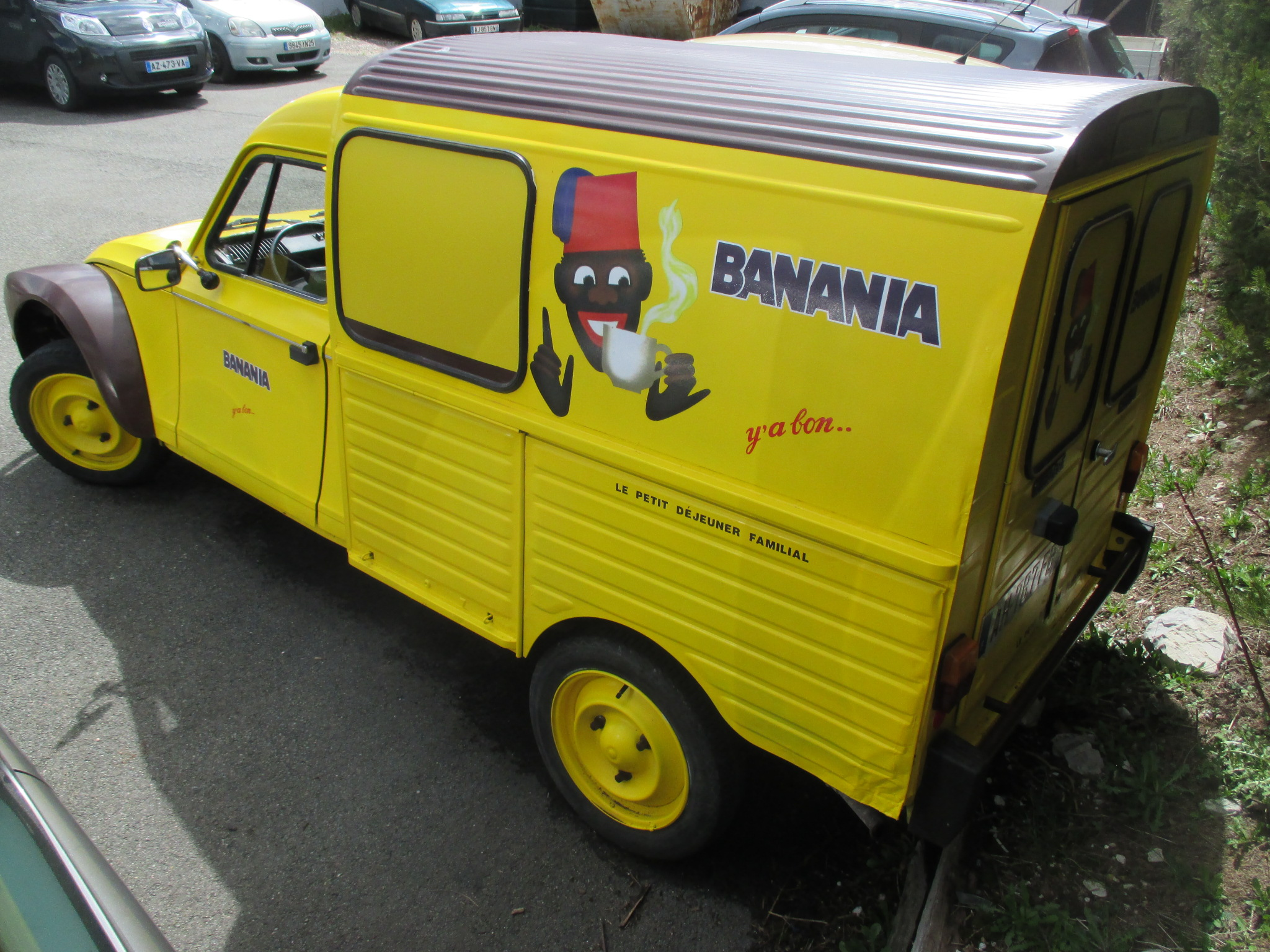
A Citroën Acadiane with Banania advertising in 2016

This brand of chocolate drink is recognized by its trademark the 'bonhomme Banania': a black man wearing a fez. The company started using this illustration in 1915.

== Controversy ==
Some feel that the advertising slogans and images are racist and colonialist as it reinforces the cliché of a friendly yet stupid African. Some French black people connect this stereotype with aggressive colonialist policy in Africa of the global group Unilever, the former owner of the brand. The Martiniquan psychiatrist and philosopher Frantz Fanon, in his 1952 book Black Skin, White Masks, mentions the grinning Senegalese tirailleur as an example of how in a burgeoning consumer culture, the black subject appears not only as an object, but as "an object in the midst of other objects".

== See also ==
- Aunt Jemima
- Uncle Ben's
- List of chocolate beverages
