= Pozol =

Fermented prehispanic corn beverage

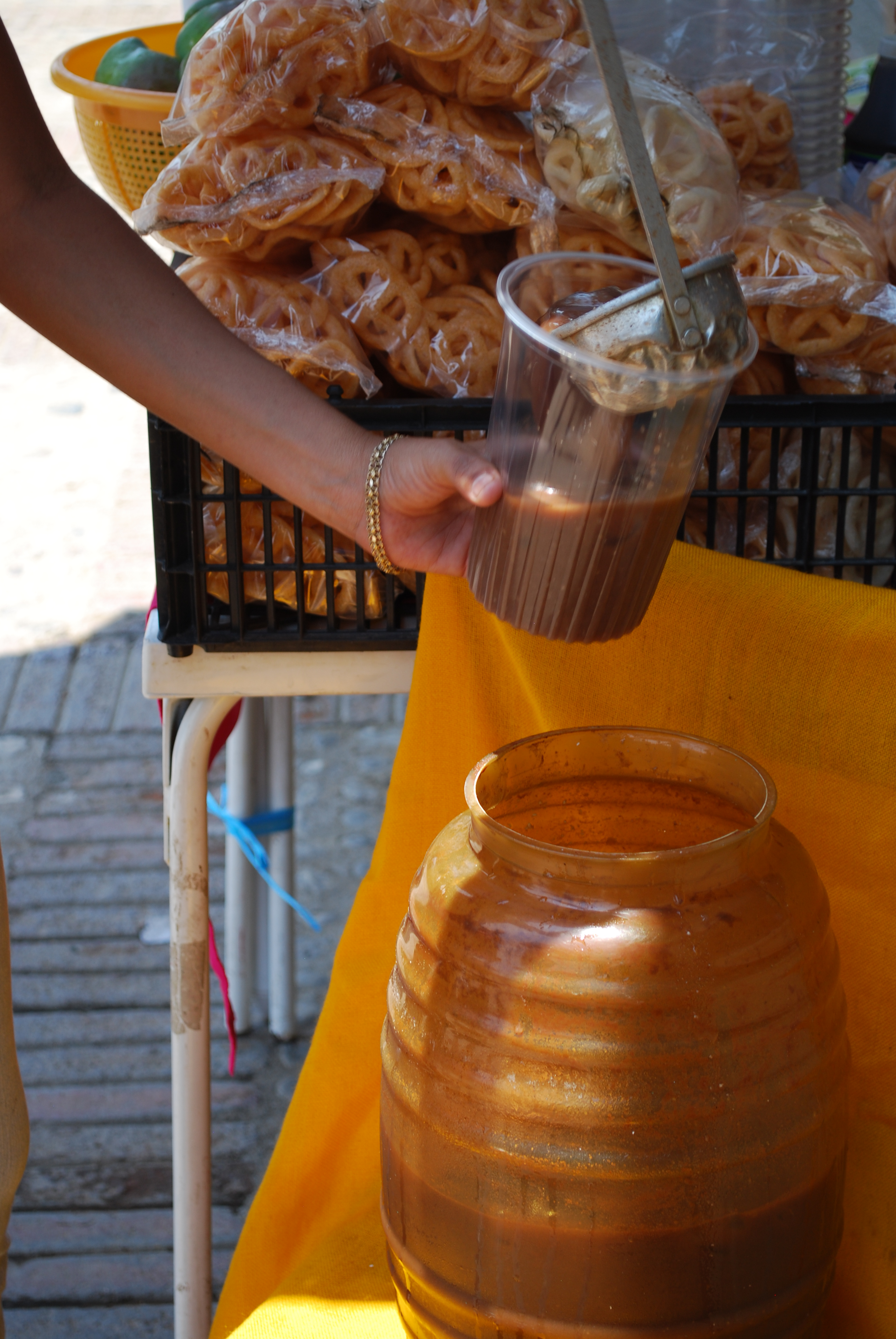
- Pozol being served at the boardwalk of Chiapa de Corzo, Chiapas
- Ingredients: corn dough

Pozol (from the Nahuatl Pozōlli) is the name of both fermented corn dough and the cacao drink made from it, which has its origins in Pre-Columbian Mesoamerica. The drink is consumed in the south of Mexico in the states of Campeche, Chiapas, and Tabasco. It is a thirst quencher that has also been used to fight diseases. It has also aided indigenous peoples of the Americas as sustenance on long trips across the jungles.

== History ==
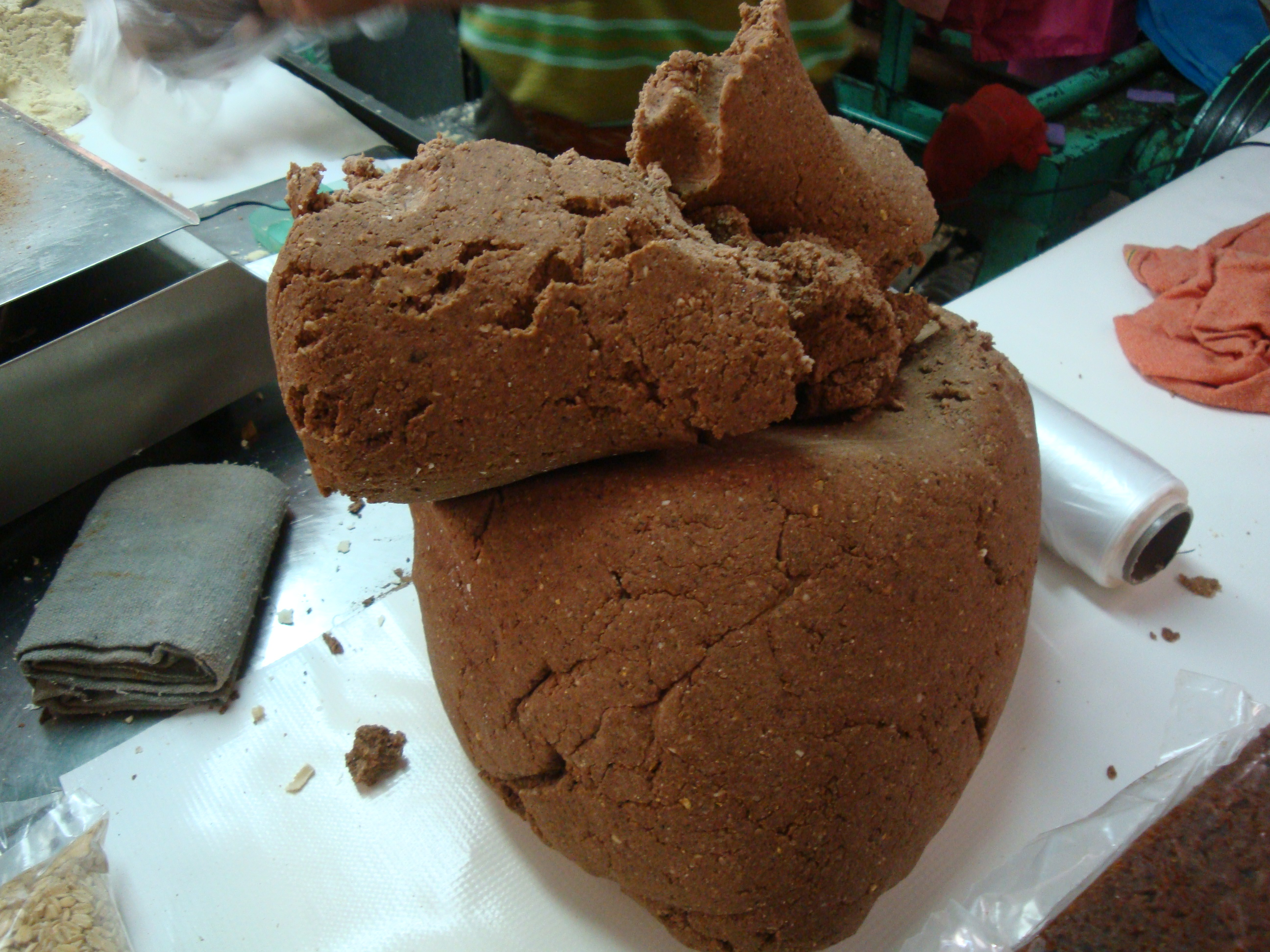
Special Cacao pozol, ready for making the drink in a market of Villahermosa, Tabasco

Since ancient times, the Maya-Chontales from Belize prepared this drink with boiled cornmeal, cocoa, and grains. Initially, it was called pochotl (from Nahuatl, pozolli, meaning "sparkling"), but after the arrival of the Spanish in Tabasco in 1519, the name changed to the now-familiar "pozol". Pozol was traditionally made by women by fermenting corn dough, which, when dissolved in water, is eaten raw by various ethnic groups of southern and southeastern Mexico. In Chiapas, this drink was prepared for Mayans, Zoqueans and Chiapanecos.

Pozol is drunk throughout the day, especially by the lower classes, though it is generally used throughout all classes. In pre-Hispanic times, it was drunk mixed with cocoa, unsweetened; since the twentieth century, sugar and ice are added throughout Chiapas.

Because it does not go bad easily, pozol cornballs have been used by various groups as provisions for their long journeys through the jungle. Besides its use as food, the drink has also been used as medicine and for religious ceremonies. In the past pozol balls were used by the Maya as a poultice, and to prevent or treat skin infections and wounds.

Pozol also had a ceremonial importance, since pre-Hispanic times, it was used as an important component of offerings in various Maya festivities. These festivities were related to the cultivation and harvest of corn. Pozol is still used today by the Maya of the Yucatán Peninsula (who call it K'eyem) as part of their harvest rites.

== Preparation ==
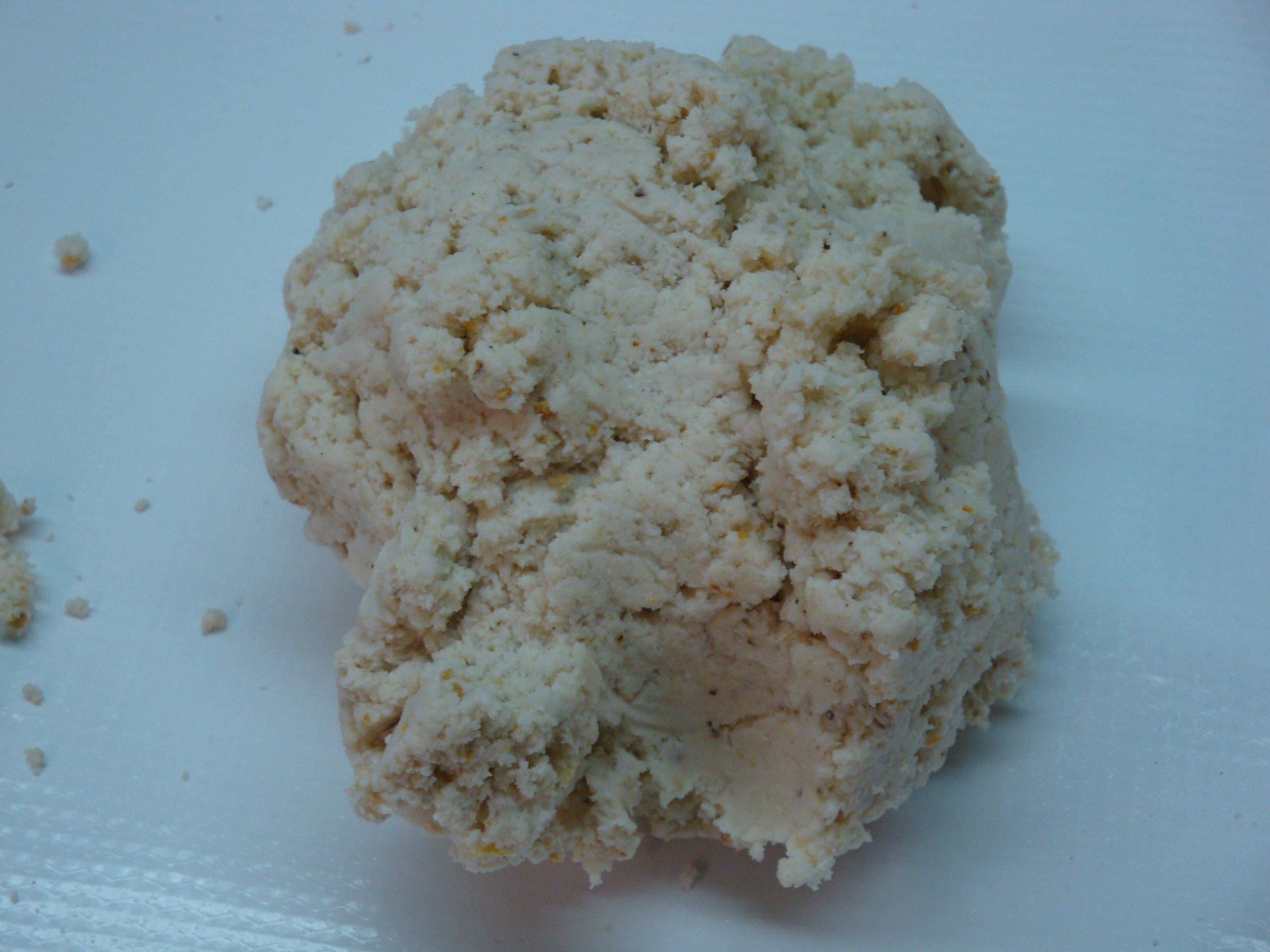
The white Pozol, ready to make the drink, in a market of Villahermosa, Tabasco

Pozol is made by fermenting corn dough, which is then rolled into balls or loaves and may be preserved in banana leaves. The drink, which is a "sort of whitish porridge," is made by soaking the dough in water. Common extra ingredients included chili pepper, honey, and sugar.

White pozol is made from dough mixed with sweetened or unsweetened water. It can be sweetened with sugar or not. Some people from Tuxtla Gutierrez, Chiapas also prefer to prepare sourdough. Sour pozol is more common in Campeche, Yucatan and Chiapas. Sourdough is fermented for three days and can be taken with or without sugar. It can be consumed cold with a pinch of salt and a slice of chili (or swallowing salt mixed with chili powder). Currently, the Lacandones use pozol mixed with honey to lower fever and control diarrhea and other intestinal disorders, in a similar way as other people use drugs or eat foods containing yeast or Lactobacillus. Today, pozol is also prepared using milk and horchata. The corn dough is mixed with milk, instead of water, and sugar. This combination makes a much sweeter version of the traditional pozol. Sweetened pozol with cocoa is the most popular version of pozol in Tabasco.

== Pozol in Tabasco ==
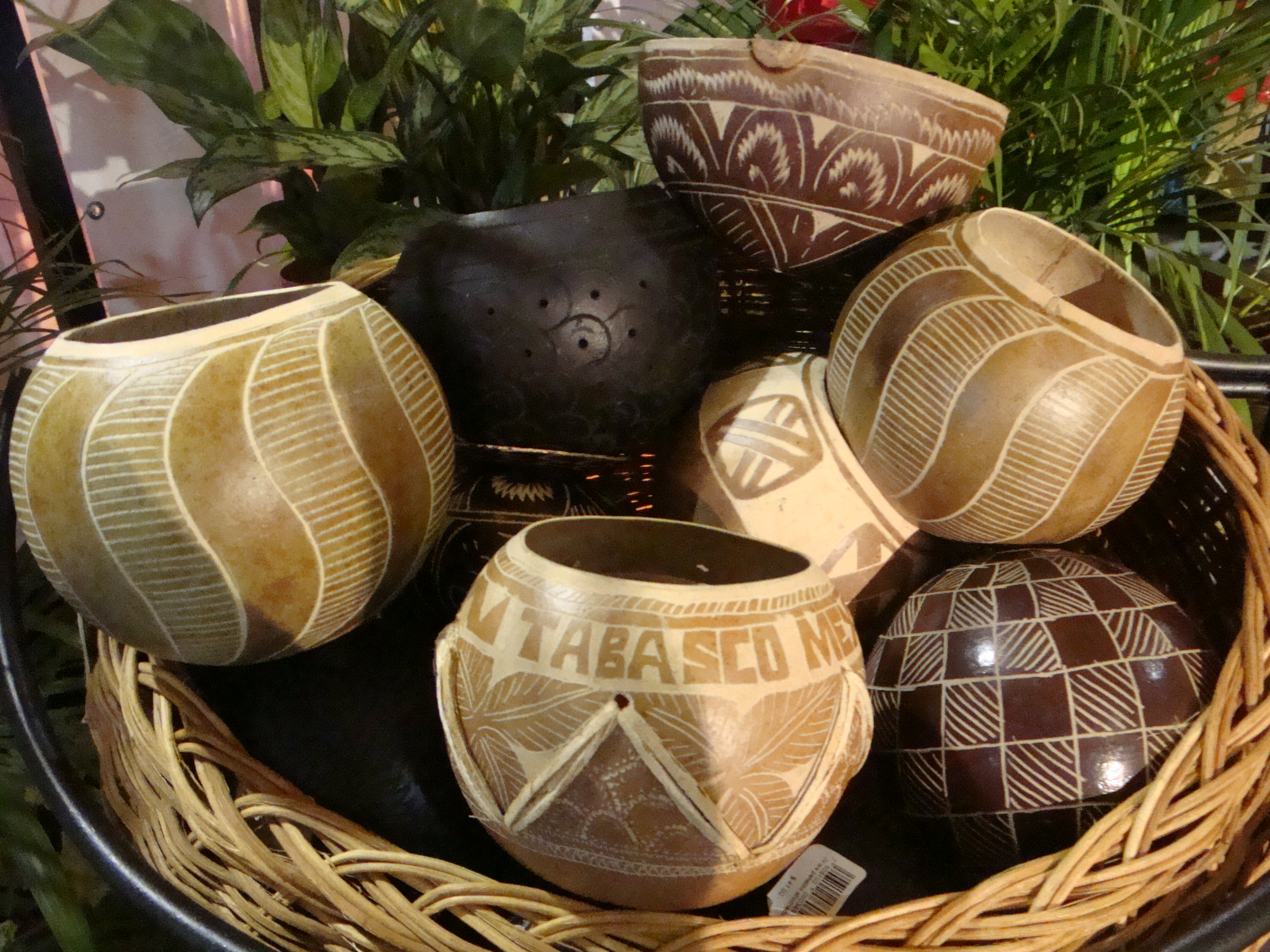
"Jícaras", Crescentia cujete gourds in which pozol is traditionally drunk in Tabasco

In the State of Tabasco, pozol is also a traditional drink. During the Prehispanic era, pozol was a highly appreciated beverage due to its resistance qualities, this was believed mainly in Tabasco.

In 1579 the government of Tabasco declared that pozol was a typical "tabasqueña" beverage. In the declaration, it was said that: "It was the custom, especially among the Chontal indians of not eating but only drinking, and if they ate, they ate very little and drank a beverage that is made of their currency, which is cacao... and also another one made of cooked corn that is called pozol".

Pozol has been widely consumed in Tabasco since pre-Hispanic times. Europeans described pozol as a beverage that allowed the indigenous people to resist the heat of this tropical zone.

In Tabasco there are four different types of pozol: white pozol, black pozol, Cacao Special pozol, and sour pozol. In the little towns and villages it is customary to drink white pozol without sugar, and instead using salt and fresh chile amashito, or with candied papaya called "Oreja de mico", in English, "monkey's ear".

Pozol, just as the "Pocho" dance, the "caballito blanco", is very representative of the culture and variety in the State of Tabasco.

In Villahermosa, and all Tabasco, it is common to find many places to try pozol. There is a saying: "A visitor who arrives to Tabasco and drinks pozol and likes it, takes up residence in Tabasco".

== Pozol in Chiapas ==
For some of the native people or "indígenas", Pozol represents a semi-ritual to their gods. Since ancient times, the Mayans, Zoqueans and Chiapanecos from this state, as well as the ones from Tabasco, made this beverage using cooked corn and cacao.

Pozol is a beverage usually enjoyed at midday, to calm both hunger and thirst. It is very nutritive as it is rich in amino acids, vitamins and fiber. Locals may accompany this drink with a small bite, usually a taco or empanada, but also enjoy the non-cacao version by biting on chilli conserves quenching its spicy taste with the freshness and smoothness of the cold corn-based drink.

== See also ==
- List of chocolate drinks
- List of maize dishes
- Atole
- Tejuino
- Poi (food)
- Ogi (food)
