= Kókómjólk =

Icelandic chocolate milk beverage

- Logo of Kókómjólk
- Type: Chocolate milk
- Manufacturer: Mjólkursamsalan
- Origin: Iceland
- Introduced: 1973
- Colour: brown
- Website: www.ms.is/vorumerki/kokomjolk

Kókómjólk (Icelandic pronunciation: [ˈkʰouːˌkɔˌmjoul̥k], Chocomilk) is an Icelandic chocolate milk beverage manufactured by Mjólkursamsalan since 1973 and has been produced solely in Selfoss, which produces more than 9 million cartons a year. The brand's slogan is "You get power from Kókómjólk" (Icelandic: Þú færð kraft úr Kókómjólk).

The beverage originally had a purple and yellow striped female cat mascot named Branda ("bröndótt" being the Icelandic word for brindle), which was replaced by a male cat named Klói in 1990. The mascot's design was changed in 2014 where its body composition was made leaner.

Starting in early 2006, a sugar-free version of the drink was put on the market.

== Mascot ==
Klói is the mascot of Kókómjólk and was originally created by Jón Axel Egilsson. His appearance is a lean anthropomorphic cat with stripes and his signature colors are pink and yellow. His appearance has changed a lot over the years but got a major redesign in 2014 and his body was made more leaner and more athletic. Klói is frequently seen saying the brand's slogan "you get strength from kókómjólk" (Icelandic: Þú færð kraft úr kókómjólk).

== Production ==
Kókómjólk started production in 1973 and has been in production solely in Selfoss. As of 2023, 9 million cartons are consumed every year. In 2012 the brand won first place in the International Food Contest in the dairy category, which was the first time the manufacturer, Mjólkursamsalan won that contest.
