= Mayordomo =

Mexican chocolate brand

- Founded: 1956
- Headquarters: Mexico
- Products: Chocolate, mole
- Website: https://chocolatemayordomo.com.mx/

Mayordomo (lit. 'butler') or Chocolate Mayordomo (lit. 'chocolate butler') is a brand of Mexican chocolate para mesa (English: 'table chocolate') produced by the company Chocolate Mayordomo De Oaxaca, S. De R.L. De C.V., and based in Oaxaca, Oaxaca, Mexico. The company manufactures mole (lit. 'sauce') sauce in addition to table chocolate.

== History ==
The company was founded in 1956 by a family business, originating from Tlacolula, Oaxaca. Originally created from passed down knowledge of chocolate making with the intention of sharing the culture.

== Products ==
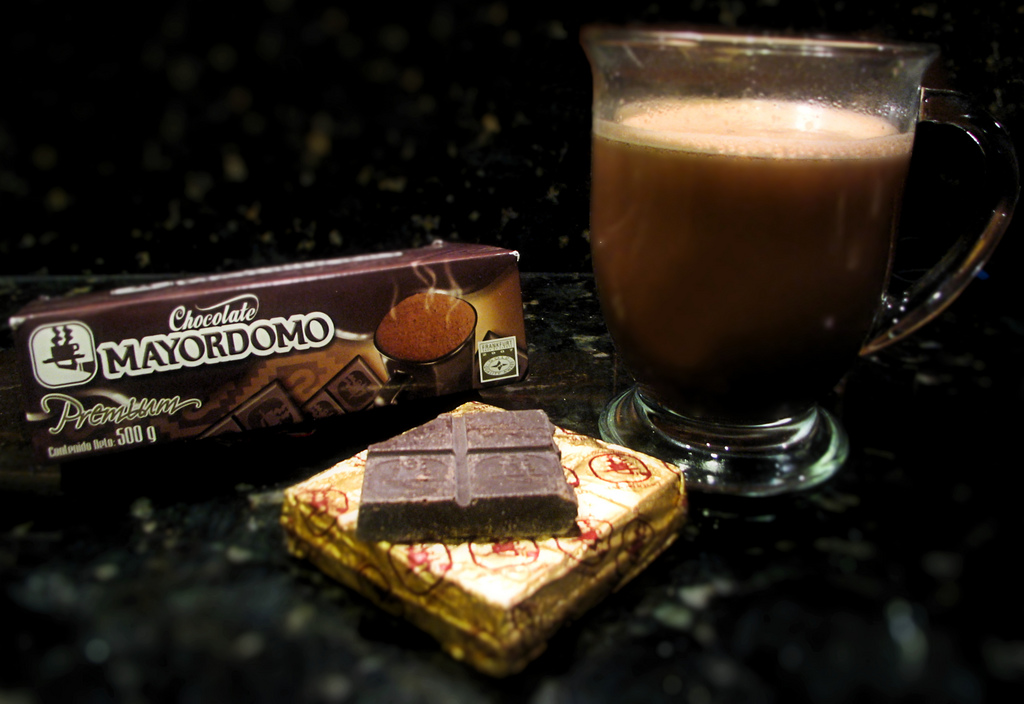
A mug of hot chocolate made with Mayordomo chocolate bars

Unlike many other commercial chocolates, Mayordomo includes only four ingredients, sugar, roasted cacao beans, almonds and cinnamon. These ingredients are ground and blended forming a paste that is pressed into bars and discs.

Due to its undissolved granulated sugar, and its rough and gritty texture, the table chocolate is not meant to be eaten like a chocolate bar, although Mayordomo bars can be eaten out of hand. The bars and discs are primarily used to make hot chocolate in traditional Mexican form. Chocolate Mayordomo is prepared on the stove by dissolving the squares in hot milk or water, then whisking the cocoa with a molinillo or wire whisk. In the traditional Aztec and Mayan form, chile peppers are added to make both sweet and savory dishes.

Their chocolate also comes in many varieties:

- Chocolate Clássico (Classic Chocolate)
- Chocolate Semi Amargo (Bittersweet Chocolate)
- Chocolate Premium (Premium Chocolate)
- Chocolate Amargo Vainilla (Bitter Vanilla Chocolate)
- Chocolate Amargo Nuez (Bitter Walnut Chocolate
- Chocolate Amargo Canela (Bitter Cinnamon Chocolate)
- Chocolate 100% Cacao (100% Cacao Chocolate)
- Chocolate Amargo Avellana (Hazelnut Chocolate)

Their mole also comes in Mole Negro (Black Mole) and Mole Rojo (Red Mole).

== See also ==
- List of chocolate drinks
- List of bean-to-bar chocolate manufacturers
