= Pucko =

Swedish beverage

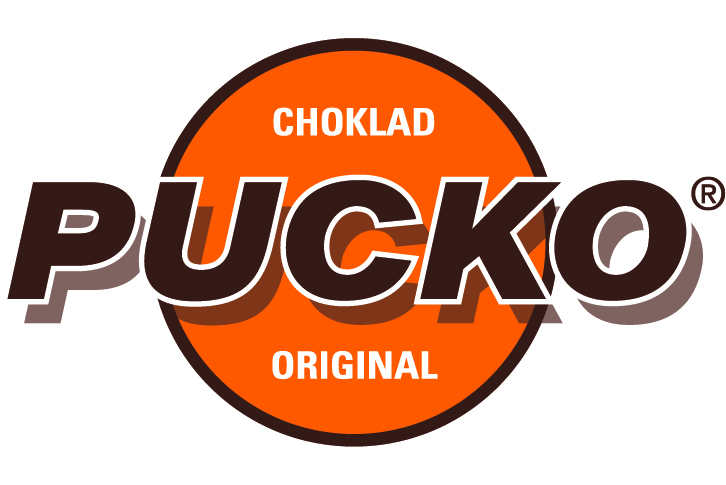
Standard logo in 2021.

Pucko is a classic Swedish drink made from milk, sugar and chocolate. It is currently manufactured by Cocio in Denmark.

== History ==
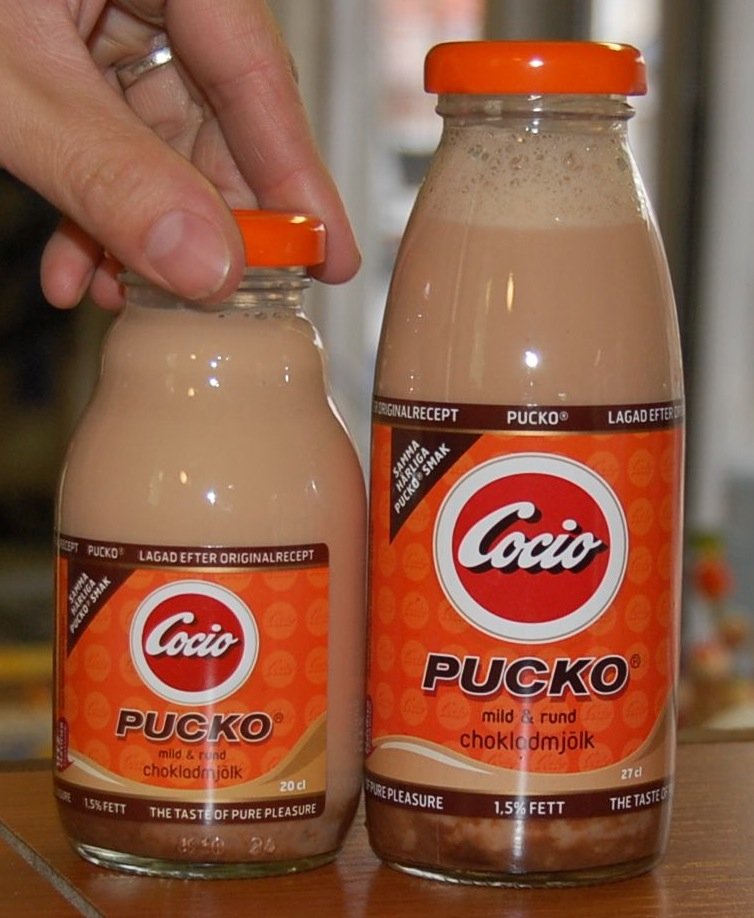
Two glass bottles of Pucko with Cocio branding as well in 2011, one 20 cl bottle to the left and one 27 cl bottle to the right.

Pucko was created in 1953, by Mjölkcentralen, predecessor to Arla Foods, in Järlåsa and launched in 1954. The name is inspired and derived from an ice cream called Choklad-puck (chocolate puck), a business that Mjölkcentralen/Arla also had at the time. "Puck" was part of the name in some way of several of Mjölkcentralens products, among them a cheese. "Pucko" is a mild slang for "idiot" in Swedish.

During the 1955 consumer product exhibition, Sankt Eriks-Mässan, 19,700 bottles were sold in 16 days. In the mid 1960s, sales increased tenfold.

The original bottle was inspired by the Coca-Cola bottle design, but it was abandoned shortly. The next design was used until 2000, when it was slightly altered to the current design.

In 1975, production responsibility was handed over to Semper, a subsidiary of Arla. In 1987, production was moved to Laholm and the factory in Järlåsa closed. Arla sold Semper in 2003, but kept the rights to Pucko, and production continued at Semper in Laholm.

On 1 July 2005, the production was transferred to Cocio in Esbjerg, Denmark. The move to a foreign company was met with criticism and upset Swedish hot dog sellers. 12 people were laid off in Laholm.

On 1 January 2008, Arla bought the remaining 50% of Cocio from E. Bank Lauridsen Holding A/S and IAT Holding A/S, making Cocio a wholly owned subsidiary of Arla and thus taking full control of the Pucko production, among other things.

During the Great Recession in 2008, sales of Arla's chocolate milks fell substantially.

There existed a Pucko ice cream from July 2009, until at least that year out by Hemglass.

For some time after the production move to Cocio, Pucko was branded with Cocio as well. As of 2021, Pucko is branded without Cocio.

== Description ==
Pucko is a cold chocolate drink that is primarily available in 20 cl glass bottles with a screw top, but there is also a somewhat bigger bottle. Pucko is now also sold in cartons, 1 L bottles and 25 cl aluminium cans. The drink itself is also available in a few variants including a diet version, a dark chocolate version and a few versions with added flavour.

Pucko is made from standard pasteurised milk, which is pumped into the process via a heat exchanger. The milk is heated to 75°C and mixed with sugar, cocoa and caramel flavouring. The latter gives Pucko its mild taste. The mixture then goes into a homogeniser and is later autoclaved. The mixture is then cooled to room temperature and is thus ready.

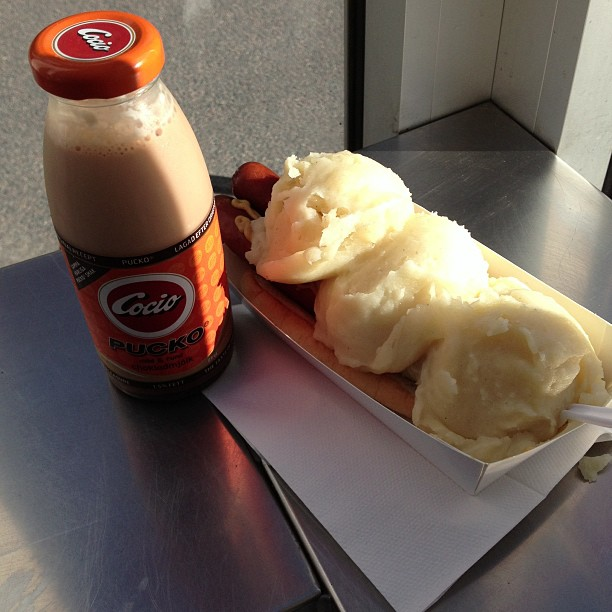
Pucko with hel special.

While Pucko is sold in most Swedish shops that sells cold beverages, it has become especially associated with hot dog vendors. To order a hot dog with a Pucko is a common cliché although it is not known how many Swedes actually prefer this combo.

Stockholmare (Stockholmer) is used as local slang for Pucko when ordering in a hot dog stand in Gothenburg. Pucko, or stockholmare, is closely associated with and often ordered together with a Gothenburg local popular dish called halv special and hel special, meaning half special and whole special, consisting of one or two hot dogs respectively in a sausage bread with mashed potatoes on top.

Pucko has been called a national beverage, a cult drink and a symbol for Sweden.

=== Nutrition information ===
Pucko 20 cl
Nourishment, per 100 g
Energy: 280 kJ/65 kcal
Carbohydrate: 10 g
Fat: 1.5 g
Protein: 3.5 g
