= Atole =

Mesoamerican hot corn beverage

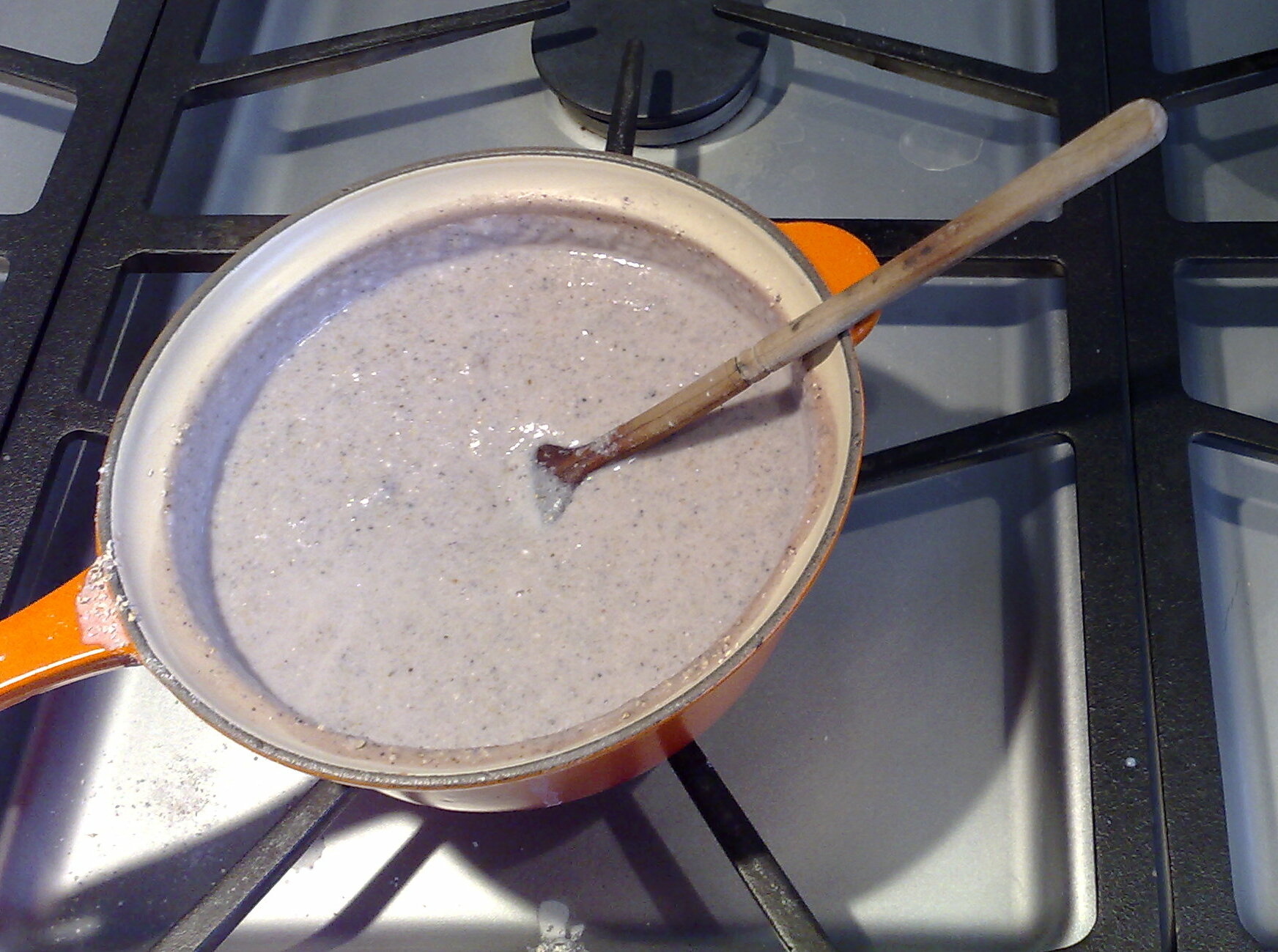
- Alternative names: Atol
- Type: Beverage or porridge
- Place of origin: Mexico
- Region or state: Mesoamerica
- Serving temperature: Hot
- Main ingredients: Masa, water, piloncillo, cinnamon, vanilla
- Variations: Champurrado

Atole (Spanish: [aˈtole], believed to come from Nahuatl ātōlli [aːˈtoːlːi] or from Mayan), also known as atolli, atol and atol de elote, is a traditional hot masa-based beverage of Mexican origin. Atole can have different flavors added, such as vanilla, cinnamon, and guava. Chocolate atole is known as champurrado or simply atole. It typically accompanies tamales and is especially consumed during Day of the Dead (observed November 2) and Las Posadas (Christmas holiday season).

== Mayan origin ==
Many Classic Maya painted vessels feature a genre of inscriptions known as the "dedicatory formula" or the "primary standard sequence" (PSS) and the two main ingredients mentioned in the contents section of the PSS were cacao and atole.

== Regional variations ==
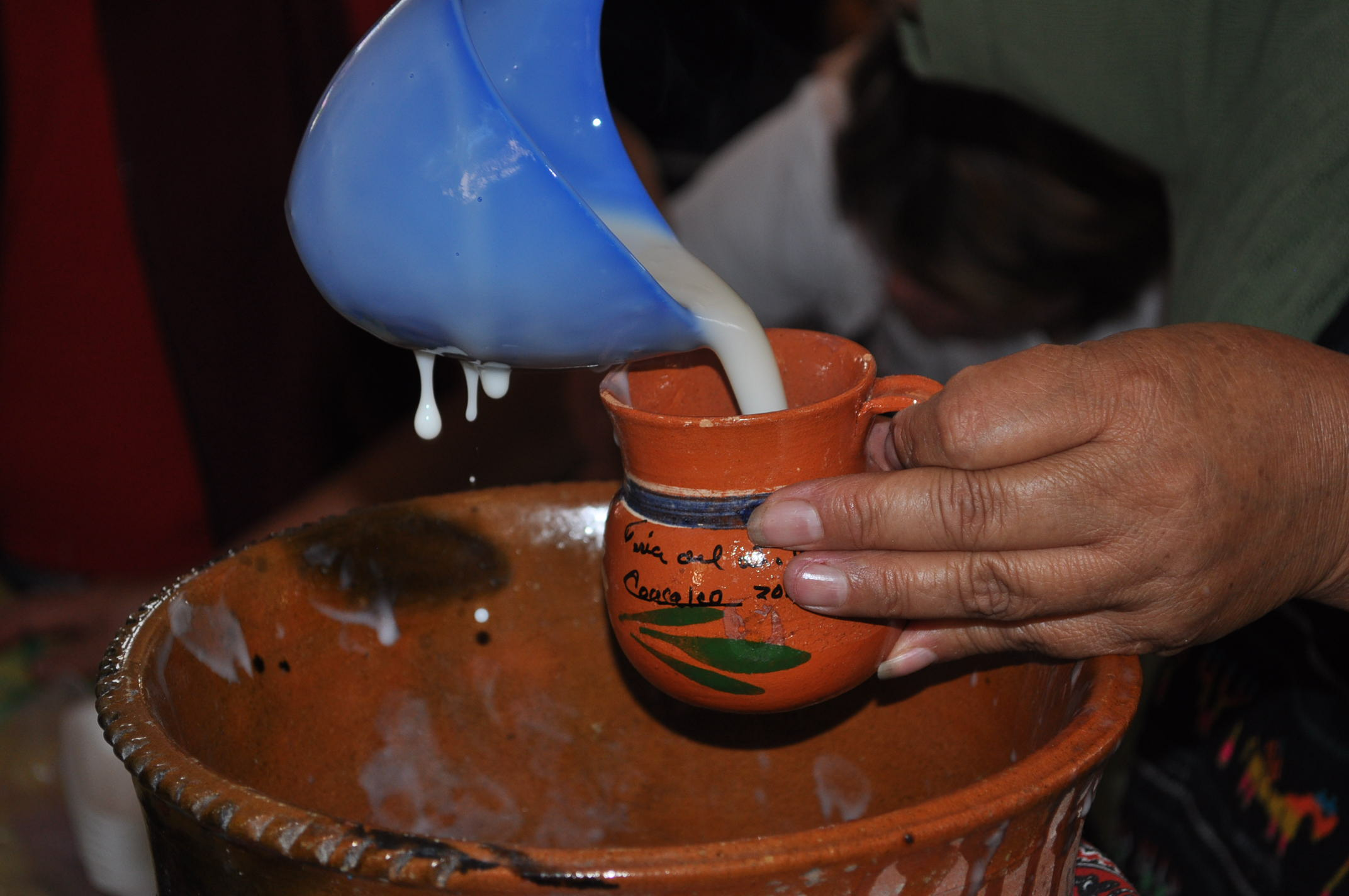
Atole served at the Atole Fair in Coacalco de Berriozábal, State of Mexico

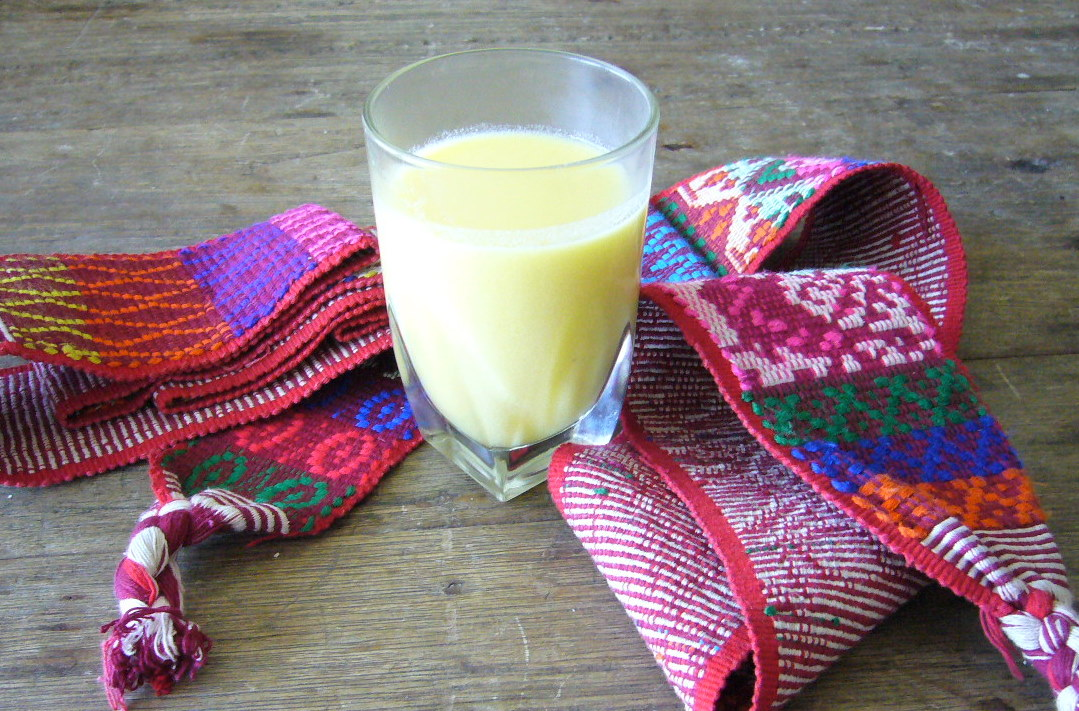
Atol de elote in Guatemala

=== Mexico ===
In Mexico, the drink typically includes masa (corn hominy flour), water, piloncillo (unrefined cane sugar), cinnamon, vanilla, and optional chocolate or fruit. The mixture is blended and heated before serving. Atole is made by toasting masa on a comal (griddle), then adding water that was boiled with cinnamon sticks.

=== Central America ===
In Guatemala, Honduras, El Salvador, and Nicaragua, atol de elote (maize atol), or simply atole, is a common beverage. Pineapple atol (atol de piña) is also consumed in El Salvador. Guatemalan varieties include atol shuco ("dirty" atol, a reference to its darker color), consumed particularly often in the city.

=== Guatemala ===
In Guatemala, the National Institute of Child Health and Human Development provided funding to INCAP to carry out a community randomized trial to test the hypothesis that improved protein intakes lead to better child development test scores. They were given a high-protein atole-like beverage made from INCAPARINA (a vegetable protein mixture developed by INCAP which mainly contains corn), dry skim milk, sugar, and a flavoring agent.

=== New Mexico ===
In New Mexico, blue corn atole is finely ground cornmeal toasted for cooking, consumed as a grainy porridge-style drink served warm, usually sweetened with sugar or thinned with milk. It is usually served at breakfast like Cream of Wheat or oatmeal. Elders are said to have drunk atole because it gave them energy. A mother who is nursing will drink atole to give her more milk.

The Puebloan peoples of New Mexico sometimes call atole chaquehue or chaquewa.

The Ancestral Puebloans began to cultivate corn around 2000 BCE, and used advanced irrigation ditches as early as 205 CE. Later, during the time of Spanish colonialization, blue corn was irrigated by Moorish-influenced acequia systems. The Hopi plant blue corn seeds in bundles of several seeds to one hole, sometimes quite deep to reach ground water.

Atole porridge is called mush by the Diné, and includes the addition of juniper ash. It is called wataca by the Hopi. Atole flour is used to create Hopi piki bread.

== Cultural references ==
The beverage is referenced in the Spanish idiom dar atole con el dedo ("to give atole with the thumb"), which means to placate with deception. It may originate from the idea of wet nurses using atole on their thumbs to placate infants; alternatively, it may refer to the practice of distributing tamales and atole during periods of drought in pre-Columbian Mexico.

== See also ==
- Avena (drink)
- Brose
- Cacao beverage
- Chicha morada
- Horchata
- Gruel
- Pozol
- List of hot beverages
- List of maize dishes
- List of porridges
