= Mjólkursamsalan =

Icelandic dairy company

Mjólkursamsalan (MS)
- Founded: 4 September 1927
- Headquarters: Bitruhálsi 1, 110 Reykjavík,
- Net income: ISK 293 million (2010) ▲
- Website: www.ms.is

Mjólkursamsalan (Icelandic pronunciation: [ˈmjoul̥kʏrˌsamˌsaːlan], MS) is an Icelandic company that produces milk and other dairy products and is the largest company in the Icelandic dairy industry. MS is owned by two cooperatives, Auðhumla a cooperative of Icelandic dairy farmers and Kaupfélag Skagfirðinga a cooperative founded in 1889 in Sauðárkrókur.

MS was formed in the 1990s to reduce cost of production. Its oldest constituent is Mjólkursamlag KEA, a dairy cooperative founded in 1927. It has about 90% share of the Icelandic milk market, and has an ongoing dispute with the Icelandic competition authority regarding a legal provision in a special law dealing with the dairy industry.
