= Tascalate =

Mexican chocolate drink

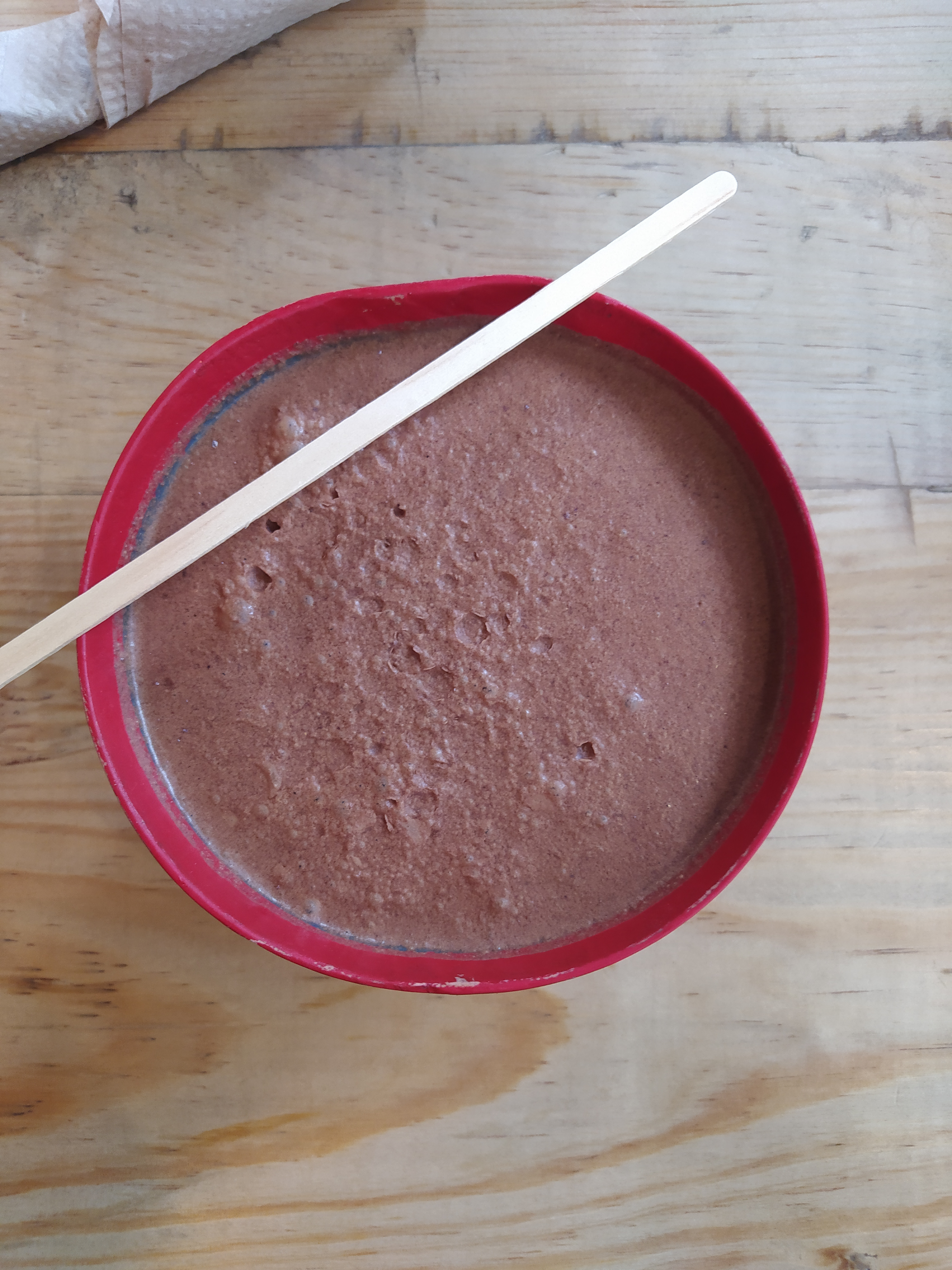
- Type: Chocolate beverage
- Origin: Mexico
- Ingredients: Toasted and ground tortilla, canela, roasted cocoa bean, annatto in pasta, sugar or panela

Tascalate (alternative spelling Tazcalate) is a chocolate drink made from a mixture of roasted maize, roasted cocoa bean, ground pine nuts, achiote and sugar or panela, very common in the Mexican state of Chiapas.

Tascalate means tortilla water (agua de tortilla) and their origins can be rooted to their noble prehispanic lineage.

Ingredients could vary, so that some variants are dominated by the taste of roasted corn, whilst other mixtures are dominated by chocolate flavor. But actually the ingredients are mostly standardized without major variations.

For preparing the hot drink, the ground ingredients are mixed with milk and heated. For a cold drink, ingredients are stirred in cold water and consumed with ice cubes.

== See also ==
- Cacao beverage
- List of chocolate drinks
