= Yoo-hoo =

American brand of chocolate beverage

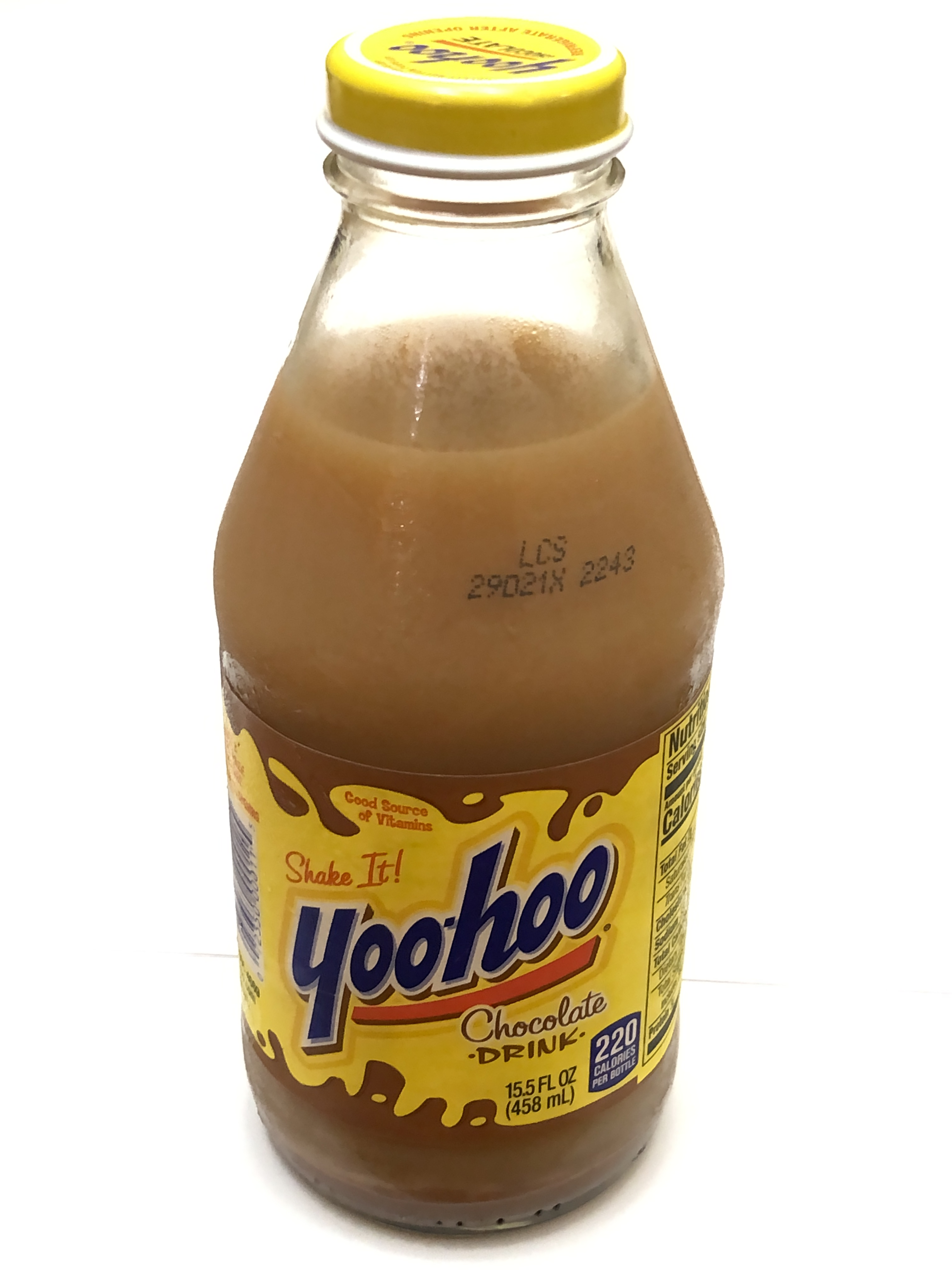
- Drink that is usually chocolate-flavored but can be other flavors
- Product type: Chocolate, vanilla, strawberry or cookie-flavored drink
- Produced by: Keurig Dr Pepper
- Country: United States
- Introduced: 1928; 98 years ago
- Previous owners: Cadbury-Schweppes
- Website: www.yoo-hoo.com

Yoo-hoo is an American brand of chocolate-flavored beverage that was created by Natale Olivieri in Garfield, New Jersey, in 1928 and is currently manufactured by Keurig Dr Pepper. As of 2019, the drink is primarily made from water, high-fructose corn syrup and whey. The drink comes in glass/plastic bottles and in drink boxes.

== History ==
Yoo-hoo was created in Garfield, New Jersey, in 1928 by Natale Olivieri, who had been bottling carbonated fruit drinks.

In the 1940s, Thomas Giresi opened a bottling plant in Batesburg, South Carolina, for distribution of Yoo-hoo. In the 1960s, an advertising campaign tried to appeal to an older public for the drink, and featured Yogi Berra and his New York Yankees teammates. Berra, in a pin-striped business suit, drinks a bottle of Yoo-hoo, lifts it next to his cheek, and says with a smile, "It's Me-He for Yoo-Hoo!"

Later, Yoo-hoo advertised as: Yoo-hoo, the chocolate action drink.

BBC Industries purchased the rights to Yoo-hoo sometime in the 1950s and retained ownership until 1976, when it sold the brand to Iroquois Brands. Yoo-hoo was sold again in 1981 to a group of private investors, which owned the brand until 1989, when it was sold to the French conglomerate Pernod Ricard.

In 2001, Pernod Ricard sold Yoo-hoo to Cadbury Schweppes, with production responsibilities falling to CS's Mott's group and marketing and advertising responsibilities under Snapple. They heightened awareness of the once-popular beverage.

The drink company's headquarters are in Tarrytown, New York, with plants in Carlstadt, New Jersey, and Aspers, Pennsylvania. An Opelousas, Louisiana, location closed in 2009. At one time, Yoo-hoo owned several other chocolate milk brands as well, including Choc-Ola, Brownie, Cocoa Dusty, and Chocolate Soldier.

In May 2008, Cadbury-Schweppes split into the Cadbury candy business and the Dr Pepper Snapple Group soft drink firm, with the latter taking over Yoo-hoo.

=== Alleged misleading advertising ===
In 2010, a legal suit was brought against the Dr Pepper Snapple Group in New York state by Timothy Dahl. The suit alleged that the Dr Pepper Snapple Group engaged in misleading advertising as to the nutritional makeup of Yoo-hoo. Papers filed by Dahl claimed that the drink "contains dangerous, unhealthy, non-nutritious partially hydrogenated oil". Further, he stated that the drink "contains virtually no milk and instead is mostly water, sugars, milk by-products and chemicals." However, Motts LLP, which made the drink during this time, said the drink contains "seven vitamins and minerals and no preservatives" and that they stood by their product.

== Flavors ==
Yoo-hoo "Double Fudge"

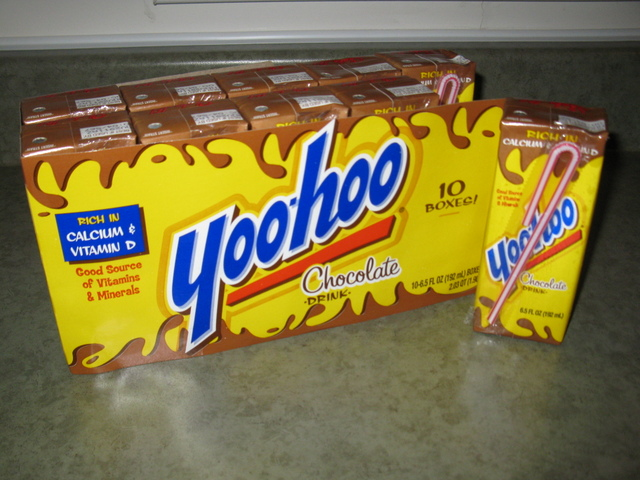
Yoo-hoo "Drink boxes"

Yoo-hoo began introducing new flavors to its lineup in 1995, including chocolate-coconut, chocolate-mint, chocolate-banana, and chocolate-strawberry. Yoo-hoo's other flavors have included vanilla, strawberry, cookies & cream, chocolate peanut butter, and chocolate caramel. The Double Fudge, banana, and Island Coconut flavors were discontinued.

== See also ==
- List of chocolate beverages

== Bibliography ==
- Lanza, Howard D. (2002). Garfield. Arcadia Publishing. ISBN 9780738510507.
