= Vi-Co =

Canadian chocolate milk brand

Vi-Co was a brand of chocolate milk manufactured by the company Dairy Producers. When Dairy Producers were bought out by Dairyland in 1995, the Vi-Co line was abolished. It was available in Saskatchewan, Canada, a few parts of Manitoba, New Brunswick and Quebec. Laiterie Royale in Beauce, Quebec, still uses the name Vico for one of their chocolate milk products.

The term 'Vi-Co' is still occasionally used today in Saskatchewan and Quebec as a slang term for any chocolate milk. It is a notable regional attribute for both provinces and is frequently cited as a defining feature of Saskatchewan's folk history.

An alcoholic beverage, a variation of the White Russian, was made with vodka, ice, and Vi-Co, and known as the "Psycho Vi-Co".

Vi-Co was available in Ontario as far back as the 1930s. The Bowmanville Dairy, owned by the Bettles family at the time, introduced Vi-Co in their page 4 ad in the Canadian Statesman on August 27, 1936.

Vi-Co was also a chocolate milk trademark for the Sherbrooke Pure Milk Co. (1911-1976) in Sherbrooke, Québec. Vi-Co is still widely used as referring to any chocolate milk in the eastern townships.
