= Cocio =

Chocolate milk drink

Coordinates: 55.5102°N 8.4771°E

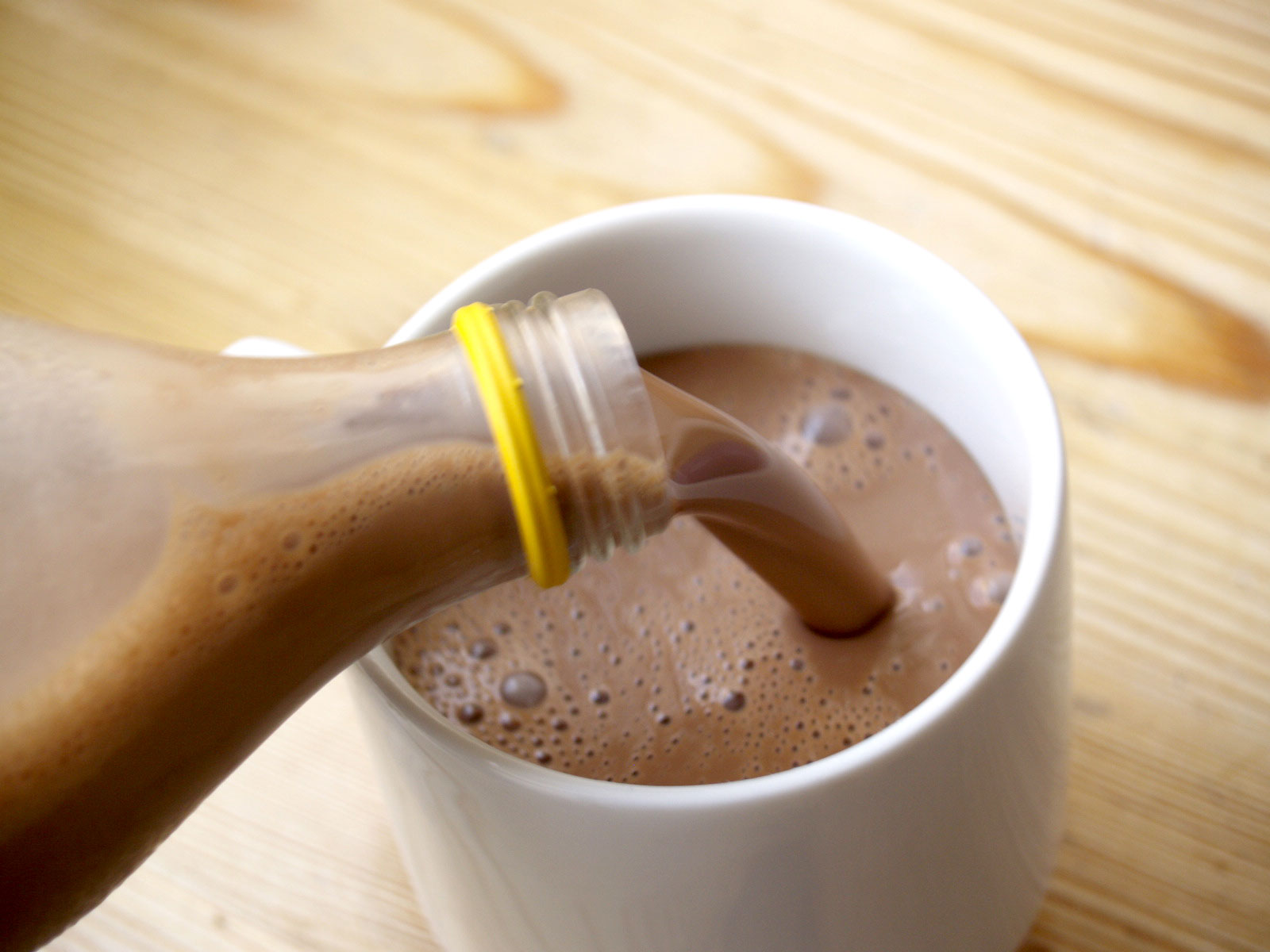
Cocio

Cocio is a chocolate milk drink produced in Esbjerg, Denmark. It is moderately popular in the rest of Scandinavia and, to a lesser extent in some US regions, namely New England. It is also available in the Philippines, Spain, the UK, the Netherlands and Poland.

The new factory in Esbjerg was first used in 2002. The factory is 8,000 square meters, and contains production and administration.

== History ==
Cocio was founded by Anker Pallesen in 1951. He and his wife began researching recipes in their own kitchen. In the beginning, the new factory produced 1,000 bottles a day.

In 1976, he sold the company to The Borden Food Corporation in United States, but production continued in Esbjerg. In the mid-1980s, Cocio released a new 1 litre bottle, and the drink gained popularity in Denmark. In 1988, Cocio had the first commercial in Danish television.

In 1989, the Cocio company bought its rival company, Congo, which had a 25 percent market share at the time. Following the take-over, Cocio was alone in the Danish chocolate milk market.

In 1998, Jamin Potamkin entered the product for a pilot program with the FDA to import the foreign milk on a trial basis (something that Denmark had been trying to do for over thirty years). This was the first time that a foreign milk was allowed to enter the United States and allowed to be distributed in all fifty states in a consumable form directly from the containment vessel. Though Arla Foods (then a wholly Danish company under the business name of MD Foods) also asked Jamin Potamkin to get other dairy products (in particular their yoghurt) into the United States and had their head of US operations ask for assistance, it was refused by Jamin Potamkin and the United States Federal Government. No other Danish liquid dairy products are allowed to enter the US territory, except for the maximum allowed under the Federal Import Milk Act (FIMA), which allows for liquid milk to enter as a percentage in a combined product, i.e. baby formula with 10% or less foreign milk.

In 1999, the companies E. Bank Lauridsen Holding A/S and IAT Corporation decided to buy Cocio, to bring the Danish spirit to the company again. Then in 2002 Arla Foods became joint owner, buying a 50 percent share in the company. As of 1 January 2008, Arla Foods is the sole owner of Cocio A/S.

Cocio A/S ceased cooperation with Jamin Potamkin (A/S Imports, Inc.) and the United States in 2003. And it was also once imported into the United States by CKF Foods Inc., but is no longer available to consumers in the USA.

== Production ==
The production equipment is able to produce around 58,000 bottles per hour and is capable of packaging milk-based, juice, and iced-tea drinks in glass and tins.

== Marketing ==
Famously, Cocio have used Eva Mendes as a front figure in their commercials.
