= Choc-Ola =

US chocolate beverage

- Type: Chocolate beverage
- Manufacturer: BIC, LLC
- Introduced: 1944; 81 years ago
- Website: www.choc-ola.com

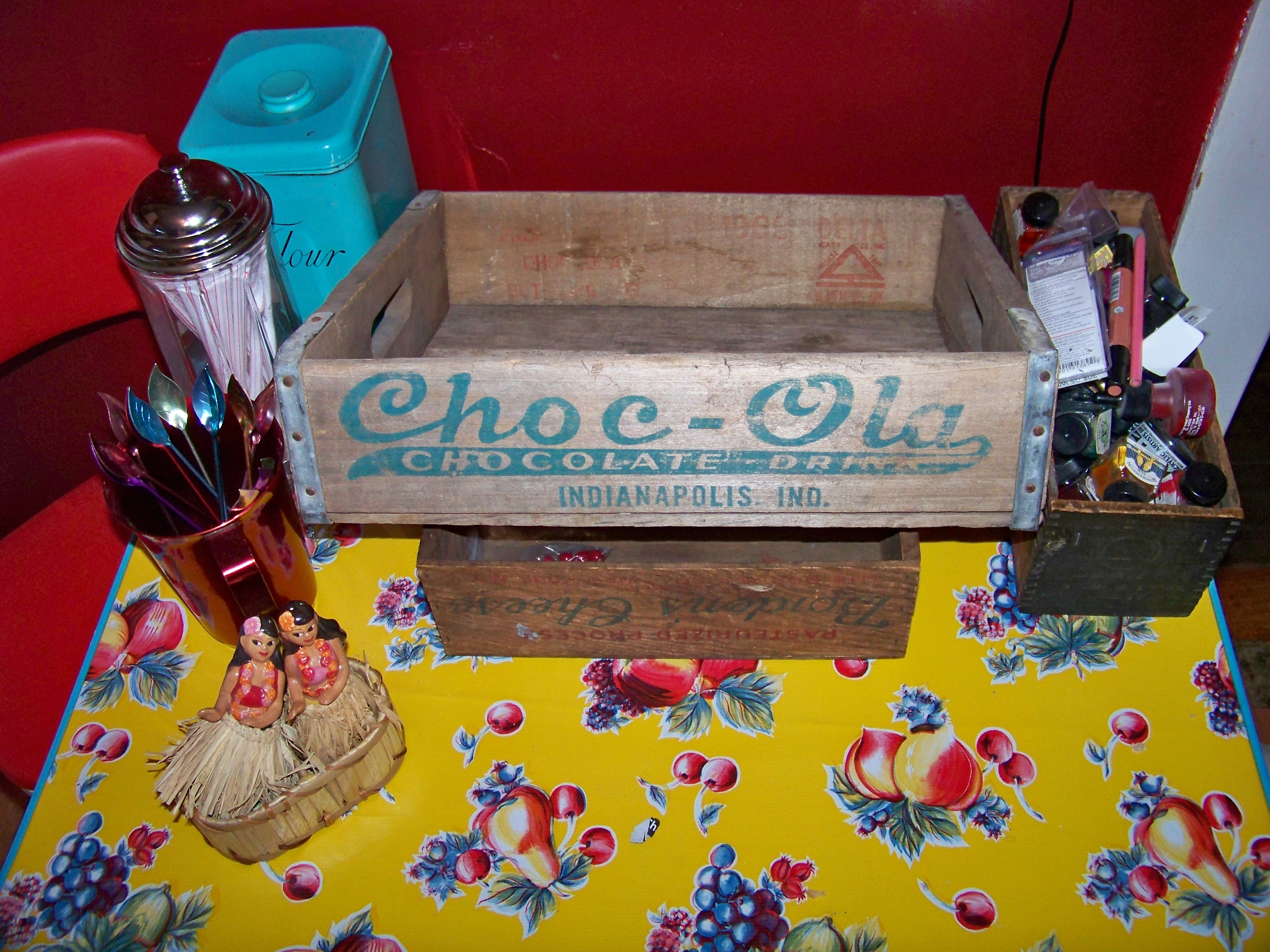
A Choc-Ola crate

Choc-Ola is an American chocolate beverage that was formulated in the 1940s by Harry Normington, Sr. from Pennsylvania.

Choc-Ola was based out of Indianapolis from 1944 until 1977, when Normington sold the brand to Moxie Industries. The Indianapolis plant had a large, white and black spotted cow on a white pole located at the south end of the main parking lot. This was to inform the public that their product was milk-based. After Moxie, Choc-Ola was owned by various companies, the last of which was Dr Pepper Snapple Group in 2009, which retired the product.

In early 2010, Dan Iaria, the owner of the Rock-Cola '50s Café in Indianapolis secured the trademark and began selling Choc-Ola again. On March 21, 2011, it was announced that an agreement was made with Prairie Farms to produce and distribute Choc-Ola through South Bend, Indiana-based Martin's Super Markets, a regional 21-store chain. Prairie Farms announced later that year that they planned to eventually distribute Choc-Ola in 17 states in individual-sized bottles and half-gallon jugs, primarily at grocery stores and convenience stores.

== Pete Rose partnership ==
In 1978, Pete Rose, a well-known sports figure of his era, contacted Choc-Ola in an attempt to partner with them. Rose and Choc-Ola launched a separate chocolate beverage, officially endorsed by Rose, called "Pete". It was assumed that his popularity at the time would make a Rose-endorsed beverage a successful business venture. However, Rose's contract prohibited him from making any unauthorized advertising reference to the Cincinnati Reds, including being shown in his Reds ball cap. This hindered the success of the Pete beverage and the drink was shelved almost as quickly as it was conceived.
