= Akta-Vite =

- Product type: Chocolate-flavoured drink mix
- Country: Australia
- Introduced: 1943
- Discontinued: 2023
- Previous owners: Sara Lee Corporation
- Tagline: Pure Aussie Goodness

Akta-Vite was a brand of chocolate flavouring for milk or plant milk. As it does not itself contain milk products, it is lactose-free and suitable for people who are lactose intolerant or avoiding dairy products for other reasons. It was created in 1943 by George Nicholas in Chadstone, a suburb of Melbourne, and initially marketed as a nutritional supplement available only in pharmacies. It was owned and manufactured by the Nicholas family through Nicholas Health and Nutrition Pty Ltd. Akta-vite is no longer in production

== History ==
Alfred Nicholas and his brother George Nicholas became wealthy by producing Australian-made aspirin sold as Aspro after Bayer lost their Australian patent during the First World War. This wealth enabled them to diversify into nutritional supplements, including Akta-Vite. Many nutrients were not readily available in synthetic form in the 1940s, with natural ingredients including vitamin A from shark livers. Akta-Vite was exported to Southeast Asia in the 1950s, and became a well-known brand in Thailand, being sold in an orange tin can.

The brand was sold to the Sara Lee Corporation in 1984, and bought back by the Nicholas family in 2016.
