= Juice fasting =

Fad diet in which only fruit and vegetable juices are consumed

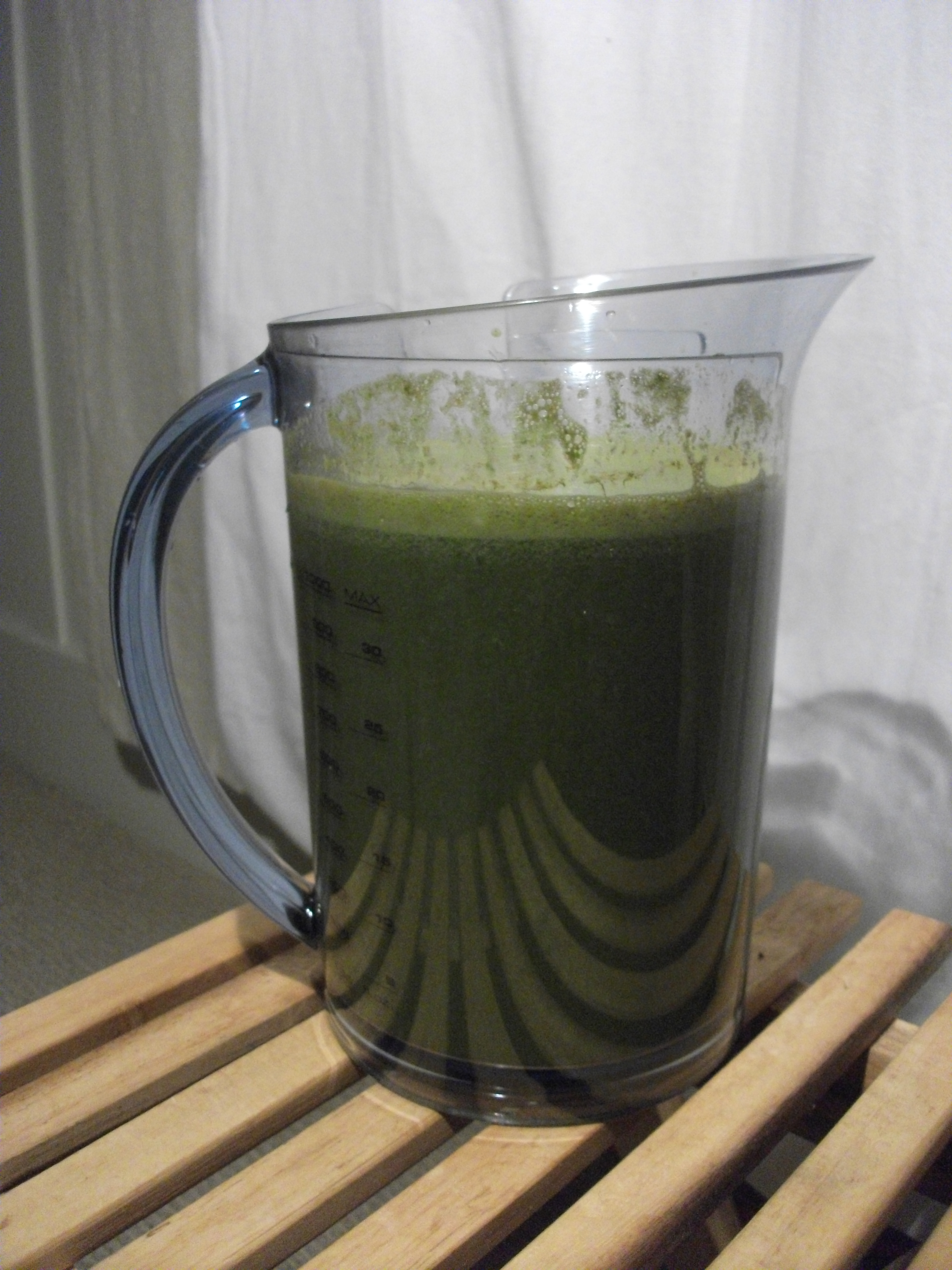
A pitcher of freshly-juiced kale, wheat grass, cauliflower, broccoli, carrot, apple, and lemon

Juice fasting, also known as juice cleansing, is a restricted diet (often short in duration) in which a person consumes only fruit and vegetable juices while abstaining from solid food consumption. It is often used for its presumed detoxification effects as part of an alternative medicine treatment, and is often part of detox diets. The diet can typically last from one to seven days and involve a number of fruits and vegetables and even spices that are not among the juices typically sold or consumed in the average Western diet. The diet is often promoted with implausible and unsubstantiated claims about its health benefits.

== History ==
Juice fasting became a growing trend in the United States because of Norman W. Walker and Jay Kordich who worked to transform the juice drink into a diet. Walker is considered to be one of the founders of the juice cleanse trend because of his technological contributions to the juicing process and his promotions of a raw food diet. In 1936, Walker created the designs for the first mechanical juicer that he named the NorWalk. The modern Norwalk 280 version of his invention is still a high selling juicer, priced at US$2,495. In addition to this new technology, Walker also pioneered today's juicing cleanse through his many cookbooks that advocated for a raw, mostly liquid diet. Kordich rose to fame through his book The Juiceman’s Power of Juicing which became a New York Times best seller. During the 1990s, Kordich worked as a TV spokesman who promoted the health benefits of a juice diet. Kordich also appeared in infomercials promoting his Juiceman Juicer that, according to Kordich, made over US$300 million in sales. Walker's and Kordich's contributions to juice fasting propelled the diet to today's current version.

In the twenty-first century, juice fasting has remained trendy with people continuing to believe that periodic juice cleanses can detoxify their bodies of unwanted chemicals. The ability for famous celebrities as well as other people to broadcast their juice diets on the internet has also popularized the lifestyle.

== Health claims ==
Health claims in regard to juice fasting are not supported by scientific evidence. Catherine Collins, chief dietician of St George's Hospital Medical School in London, England, states that: "The concept of 'detox' is a marketing myth rather than a physiological entity. The idea that an avalanche of vitamins, minerals, and laxatives taken over a 2 to 7 day period can have a long-lasting benefit for the body is also a marketing myth."

Detox diets, depending on the type and duration, are potentially dangerous and can cause various health problems including muscle loss and an unhealthy regaining of fat after the detox ends. A review in The Gale Encyclopedia of Diets, has noted potential risks of juice fasting:

The major risks to health from juice fasts include metabolic crises in patients with undiagnosed diabetes or hypoglycemia; dizziness or fainting due to sudden lowering of blood pressure; diarrhea, which may result in dehydration and an imbalance of electrolytes in the body; and protein or calcium deficiencies from unsupervised long-term juice fasts.

The American Cancer Society have stated that "there is no scientific evidence to support claims that consuming only juices for one or more days, known as juice cleansing or juice detoxification, reduces cancer risk or provides other health benefits".

Even advocates for juice fasting, such as Joe Cross, most known for his documentary Fat, Sick & Nearly Dead, do not consider the diet healthy when practiced in the long term. Cross himself describes it as a "reboot" for the body, saying,"“I am not advocating this as a long-term sustainable solution. You need to eat food.”

== See also ==
- List of diets
- List of ineffective cancer treatments
- Fat, Sick and Nearly Dead
- Green smoothie
- Fruitarianism
- Juicing
- Juicer
- Raw veganism
- Raw water § Raw water dieting
