= List of juices =

This is a list of juices. Juice is a liquid that is naturally contained in fruit and vegetables. It can also refer to liquids that are flavored with these or other biological food sources such as meat and seafood. It is commonly consumed as a beverage or used as an ingredient or flavoring in foods.

This list does not include branded juices, fermented juice drinks, syrups, or any soft drinks such as -ades and punches.

== Pure fruit juices ==
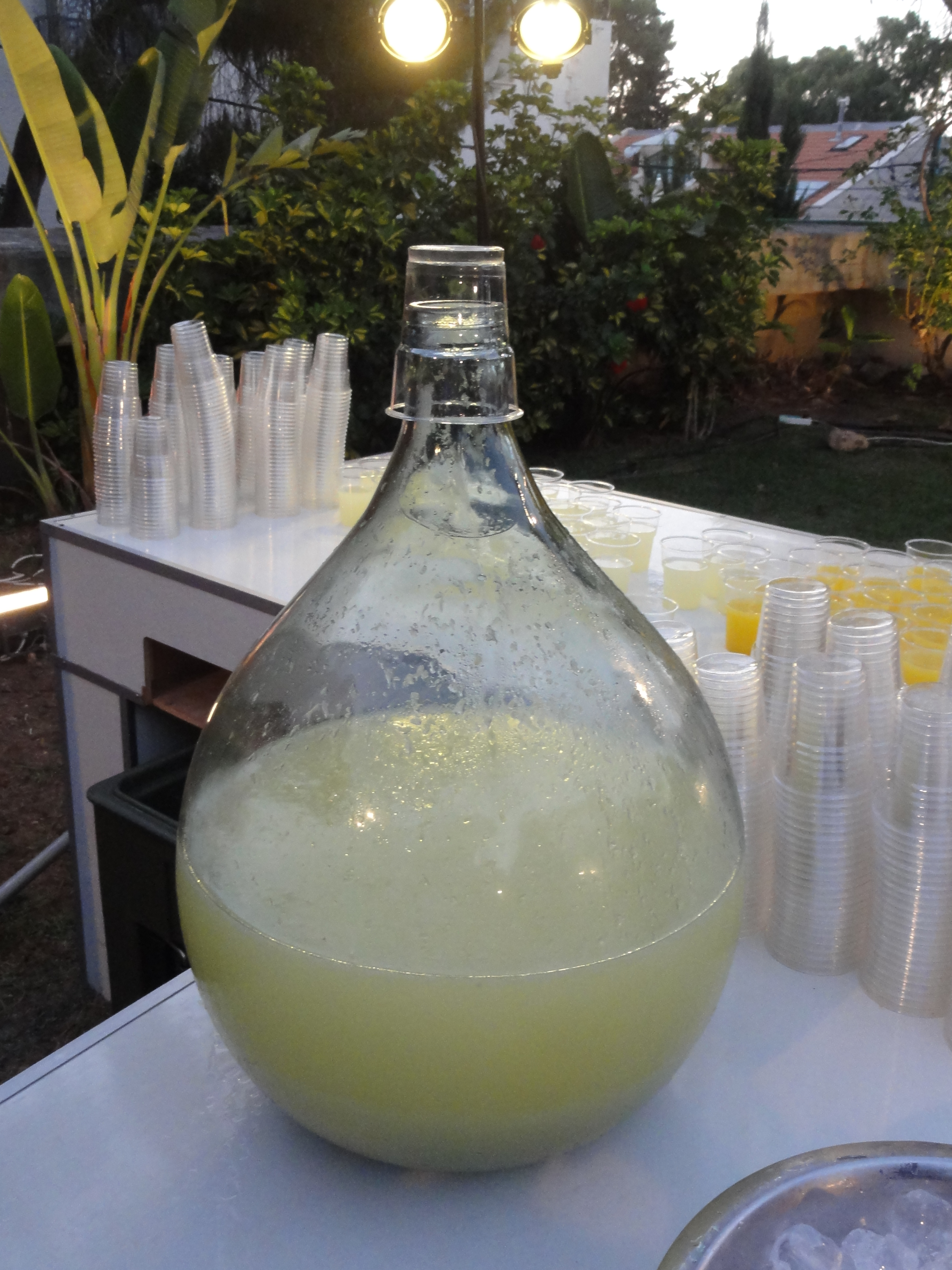
Grapefruit juice

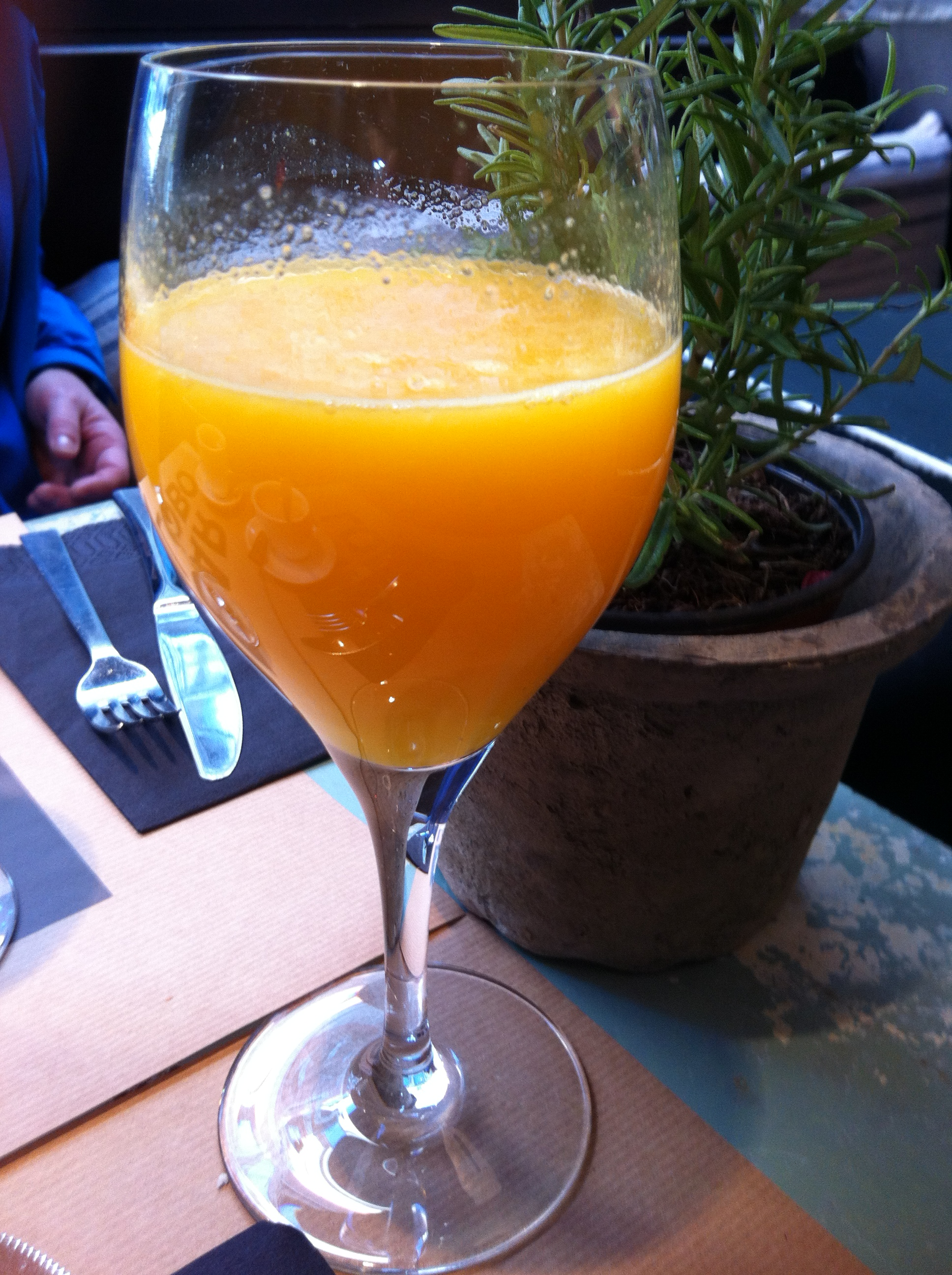
Fresh-squeezed orange juice

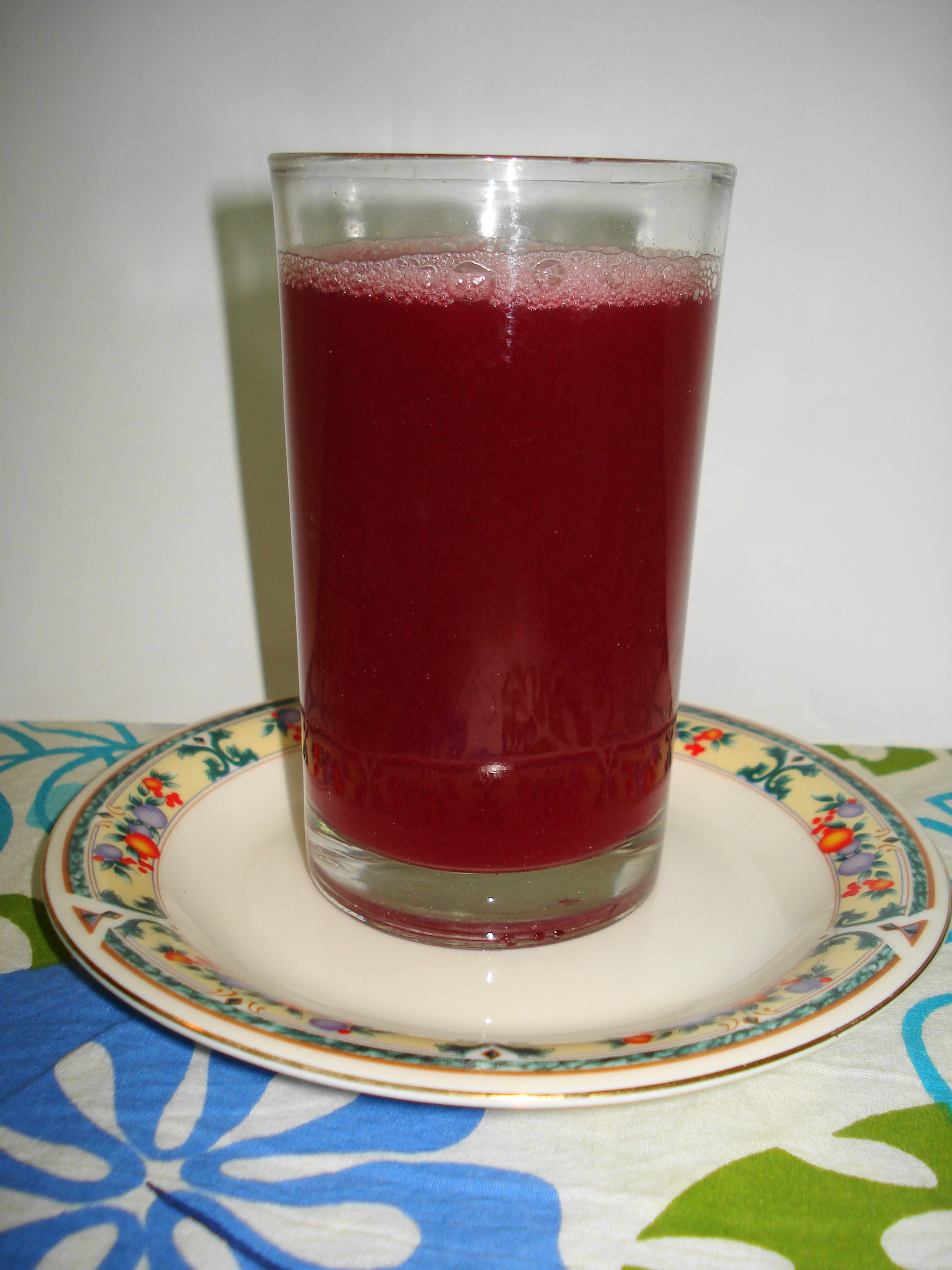
Pomegranate juice is a popular Persian drink

Juice	Primary ingredient	Notes	Ref.
Aam panna	Unripe mango		
Açaí berry juice	Açaí		
Acerola juice	Acerola		
Amla juice	Indian gooseberry		
Apple cider	Apple		
Apple juice	Apple		
Apricot juice	Apricot		
Avocado juice	Avocado		
Bael juice	Bael		
Bilimbi juice	Averrhoa bilimbi		
Bitter melon juice	Bitter melon	Referred to as 'Karela juice' in Northern India.	
Blackberry juice	Blackberry		
Blackcurrant juice	Blackcurrant		
Blueberry juice	Blueberry		
Calamansi juice	Calamansi		
Cantaloupe juice	Cantaloupe		
Cashew apple juice	Cashew		
Ceylon gooseberry juice	Ceylon gooseberry		
Cherimoya juice	Cherimoya		
Cherry juice	Cherry	Can be made from variants of Prunus including sweet cherry and tart cherry	
Chokeberry juice	Aronia		
Coconut water	Coconut (Green)		
Coconut milk	Coconut (Mature)		
Cranberry juice	Cranberry		
Date juice	Date palm		
Dragon fruit juice	Dragon fruit		
Elderberry juice	Elderberry		
Falsa juice	Falsa		
Goji berry juice	Goji		
Golden berry juice	Golden berry		
Gooseberry juice	Gooseberry		
Grape juice	Grape	Variants include must and verjuice	
Grapefruit juice	Grapefruit		
Guava juice	Guava	Other variants of Psidium are regionally referred to as guava juice, such as the strawberry guava and pineapple guava.	
Guinep juice	Spanish lime		
Hawthorn juice	Hawthorn		
Honeydew juice	Honeydew		
Jamun juice	Java plum		
June plum juice	Golden apple		
Jus gandaria	Mango plum		
Kaffir lime juice	Kaffir lime		
Kiwifruit juice	Kiwifruit		
Lemon juice	Lemon		
Lime juice	Lime		
Lingonberry juice	Lingonberry		
Lychee juice	Lychee		
Maqui juice	Maqui berry		
Mango juice	Mango		
Mangosteen juice	Mangosteen		
Melon juice	Melon		
Mosambi juice	Mosambi lemon		
Mulberry juice	Mulberry		
Naranjilla juice	Naranjilla		
Noni juice	Morinda citrifolia	The juice is potentially toxic and may cause adverse health effects.	
Orange juice	Orange	Can also be made from mandarin orange, tangerine, or clementine	
Orange (Bitter) juice	Bitter orange		
Palm fruit juice	Palm		
Papaya juice	Papaya		
Passionfruit juice	Passionfruit	Other variants of Passiflora are also regionally referred to as passionfruit juice, such as water lemon, banana passionfruit, sweet granadilla, giant granadilla, and sweet calabash	
Peach juice	Peach		
Pear juice	Pear		
Pineapple juice	Pineapple		
Plum juice	Plum		
Pomegranate juice	Pomegranate		
Pomelo juice	Pomelo		
Prickly pear juice	Prickly pear		
Prune juice	Prune		
Raspberry juice	Raspberry		
Rhubarb juice	Rhubarb		
Soursop juice	Soursop		
Starfruit juice	Starfruit		
Strawberry juice	Strawberry		
Tamarind juice	Tamarind		
Tomato juice	Tomato		
Ume juice	Chinese plum		
Watermelon juice	Watermelon		

== Pure vegetable juices ==
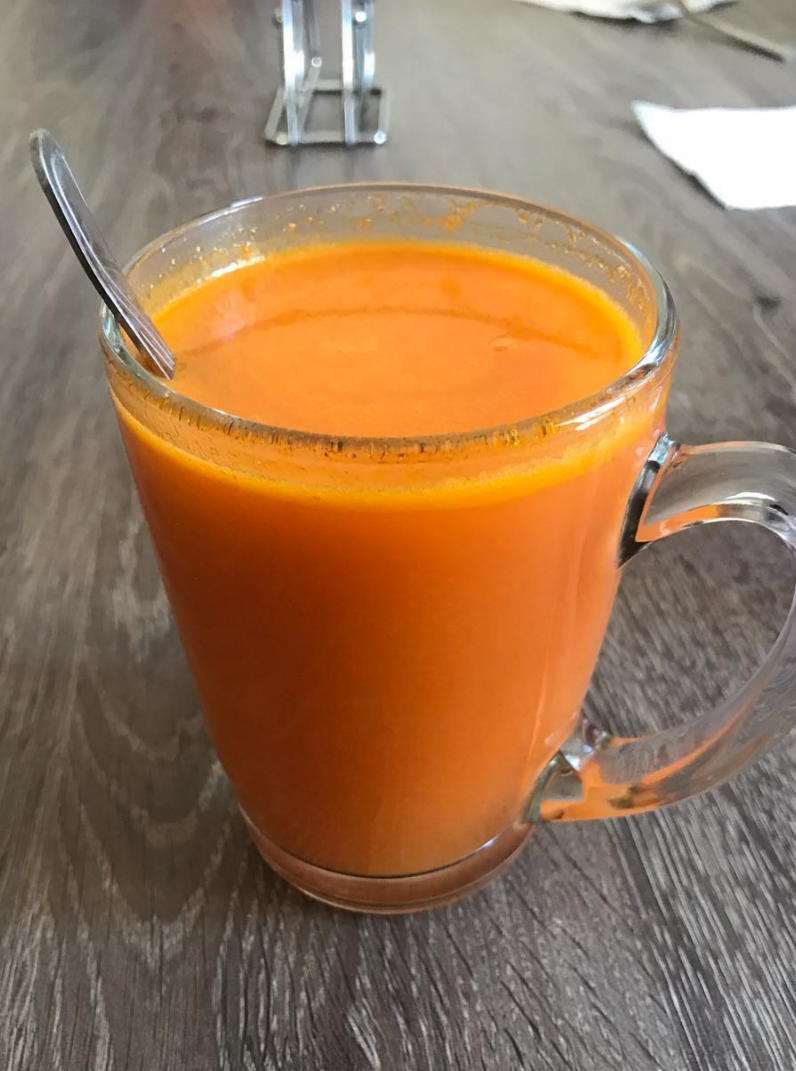
Carrot juice

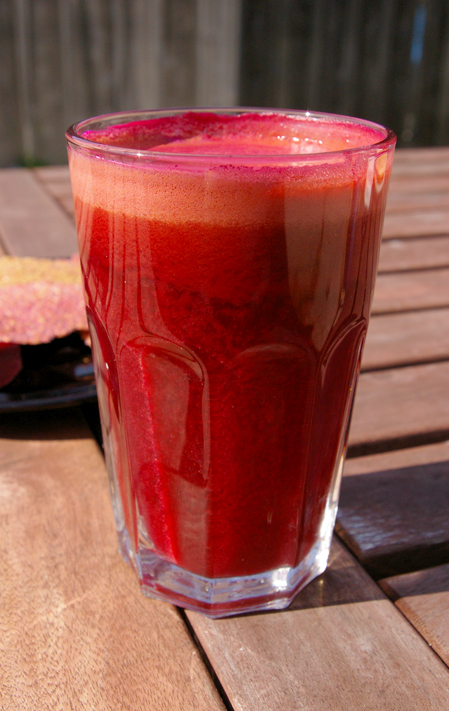
Beet juice

Juice	Primary ingredient	Notes	Ref.
Aloe vera juice	Aloe vera		
Aojiru	Kale or Barley		
Asparagus juice	Asparagus		
Beet juice	Beetroot		
Carrot juice	Carrot		
Celery juice	Celery		
Cucumber juice	Cucumber		
Dandelion-green juice	Dandelion		
Garlic juice	Garlic		
Ginger juice	Ginger		
Hemp juice	Hemp leaves		
Kale juice	Kale		
Lettuce juice	Lettuce		
Onion juice	Onion		
Parsley juice	Parsley		
Spinach juice	Spinach		
Sugarcane juice	Sugarcane		
Tucupi	Cassava		
Turmeric juice	Turmeric		
Turnip juice	Turnip		
Watercress juice	Watercress		
Wheatgrass juice	Wheatgrass		

== Meat juices ==
Juice	Primary ingredient	Notes	Ref
Clam juice	Clam		

== See also ==
- Fruit and vegetable beer
- Health shake
- Juice bar
  - Mexican juice bar (frutería)
- Juicer
- Juicing
- List of fruit dishes
- List of lemonade topics
- List of lemon dishes and beverages
- List of non-alcoholic drinks
- List of soft drink flavors
- List of syrups
- List of vegetable dishes
