= Joe Cross (filmmaker) =

Australian filmmaker

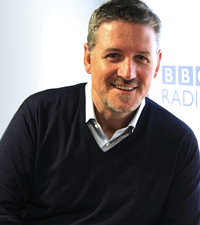
- Joe Cross in 2014
- Born: 30 May 1966 (age 60); Australia
- Occupations: Entrepreneur, author, filmmaker
- Known for: Fat, Sick & Nearly Dead
- Website: rebootwithjoe.com

Joe Cross (born 30 May 1966) is an Australian entrepreneur, author, filmmaker, and plant-based diet advocate who promotes juicing. He is most known for his documentary Fat, Sick & Nearly Dead which covers his 60-day juice fast. He is the founder and CEO of Reboot with Joe, a health and lifestyle brand.

Following the release of his documentary, Cross has published six books about juicing. His 2014 book The Reboot with Joe Juice Diet: Lose Weight, Get Healthy and Feel Amazing was a New York Times best-seller.

== Juice fast ==
By his 30s, Cross was taking medication for chronic urticaria, an autoimmune condition. He attempted treatments through conventional and alternative medicine. He smoked and regularly consumed alcohol, and his diet was mostly ultra-processed foods. Intermittently, he went on diets but did not stay on them consistently. He believed his diet was the cause of his illness, and that medication would not offer a cure.

In 2005 at the age of 39, Cross weighed 140 kilograms (310 pounds). After a doctor's visit where he was warned his lifestyle would cause an early death, he decided to consume only juice for 60 days as a treatment that he started in May. While on his juice diet, he travelled across America in a truck, talking to people about their attitudes towards food on camera. His bloodwork was monitored regularly. The juice was 80% vegetables, 20% fruit, selected in an effort to avoid consuming too much sugar. The basic juice he called the Mean Green Juice, containing a mixture of kale, apples, lemon, cucumber, celery, and ginger that he substituted ingredients for to ensure variety.

Cross reported feeling groggy and unstable for the first three to five days, after which he described feeling well physically and mentally. After 49 days, he lost 67 pounds (30 kg), his total cholesterol dropped from 204 to 135 and his LDL cholesterol went from 132 to 86. By day 61, Cross had lost 82 pounds and decreased his medicine dosage after reporting a complete loss of his urticaria symptoms. Following the 60-day juice fast, he consumed only foods derived from plants and no animal-based or ultra-processed food for 90 days.

As of March 2013, Cross weighed 240 pounds (109 kg), a weight that he maintained for the previous five years. He hit an all-time low of 210 pounds (95 kg) near the end of his first five months on the diet. Cross's future plan includes a juicing launch in the United Kingdom, France, Germany, Russia, Brazil and Chile.

Cross does not consider the diet healthy when practiced in the long term, describing it as a "reboot" for the body.

== Documentary films ==
Cross filmed his juice and travel through America, and released Fat, Sick & Nearly Dead in 2011. In the movie, while travelling, Cross meets people and talks to them about their eating habits. The movie features interview segments with people who were inspired to follow his example. He charts his progress with an itemized list of what day of the fast it is, what city and what state Cross is filming in, how much weight he's lost (both in pounds and kilograms) and what kind of medication he's taking. During his road-trip Cross meets and inspires Phil Staples, a morbidly obese truck driver from Sheldon, Iowa, in a truck stop in Arizona to try juice fasting. The movie was originally called Death By Fat. Then it became Faster. However, after Cross came to America to shoot the movie, he had to completely change the concept and the idea of the movie.

The film has been credited with doubling the sales of Breville juicers since the documentary launched on Netflix in the US in July 2011. After completing work on Fat, Sick & Nearly Dead, he continued to travel around the world to promote juicing and also plans to make a second movie about life after juicing. Cross is also involved in negotiations with media companies in the US about a TV series.

A sequel to the film, Fat Sick and Nearly Dead 2 was released in 2014. Cross produced another health documentary in 2016: The Kids Menu focuses on stopping childhood obesity.

== Reboot with Joe ==
After Fat, Sick & Nearly Dead was released in 2010, Cross founded Reboot with Joe, a health and lifestyle brand that provides information and support to people looking to make diet and lifestyle changes. The brand is focused on consuming more fruits and vegetables for improving health. As of 2014, Cross served as the CEO of the organization.

The website of the organization offers guides for starting a juice fast and which fruits and vegetables to select. The organization has a medical advisory board to collect data and conduct research about benefits of juicing.

== Books ==
Cross released his first book titled Fat, Sick & Nearly Dead in 2011 followed by a second book titled Reboot with Joe Recipe Book (Plant-Based Recipes to Supercharge Your Life) in 2012. He released a third book titled 101 Juice Recipes in 2013.

In February 2014, he released his book titled The Reboot with Joe Juice Diet: Lose Weight, Get Healthy and Feel Amazing. In this book, he shared the plan that he used for his juice fast and subsequent diet as well as stories of some other people who have lost weight with a juice fast. It also includes three-day, five-day, 10-day, 15-day and 30-day programs, healthy-eating plans and exercise tips. According to Cross, when somebody is not eating, they are giving their body a break and supplying it with micro and macro nutrients. Cross recommends using more vegetables and fewer fruits to avoid sugar present in the fruits. His latest book is titled Juice It to Lose It: Lose Weight and Feel Great in Just 5 Days and had been released in April 2016.

== Bibliography ==
- Fat, Sick & Nearly Dead (2011)
- Reboot with Joe Recipe Book (Plant-Based Recipes to Supercharge Your Life) (2012)
- 101 Juice Recipes (2013)
- The Reboot with Joe Juice Diet: Lose Weight, Get Healthy and Feel Amazing (2014)
- Reboot with Joe Juice Diet Cookbook (2014)
- 101 Smoothies (2014)
- Reboot with Joe: Fully Charged (2015)
- Juice It to Lose It: Lose Weight and Feel Great in Just 5 Days (2016)
