= Jason Vale =

English motivational speaker (born 1969)

- Vale, speaking at his Turkish retreat.
- Born: Jason Beau Vale; 21 June 1969 (age 57); Kensington, London, England
- Occupations: Author, Professional speaker
- Writing career
- Years active: 2001–present
- Subject: Orthomolecular medicine
- Website: www.juicemaster.com

Jason Beau Vale (born 21 June 1969 in Kensington, London), also known as The Juice Master, is an English author, motivational speaker, and lifestyle coach.

== History ==
Vale was an addict of smoking, alcohol, and junk food and a chronic sufferer of psoriasis, eczema, and hay fever. Influenced by early juicing pioneer Norman Walker, Jason began juicing to improve his health. In his book Slim 4 Life, Vale outlines how he lost weight, gave up smoking and drinking, and stopped eating junk food by changing his mindset to his addictions. As a result of daily juicing, Jason lost four stone (56 lbs) and claims that he is now free of his skin conditions and hay fever. Jason became a trainer for Allen Carr (the now deceased author of The Easy Way to Stop Smoking) and set up a clinic in Birmingham, West Midlands.

With the launch of his first published book in 2001 as the self-styled Juice Master, Jason Vale has continued to promote the health benefits of consuming freshly extracted juices and smoothies in the media. Vale, through publishers HarperCollins, has sold approximately 500,000 copies of his books (and accompanying DVDs) in the United Kingdom.

His books Stop Drinking 4 Life Easily! and Kick the Drink...Easily! specifically address the benefits of sobriety and offer advice for alcoholics.

Vale worked with Moulinex from 2003 to 2005 promoting one of their juice extractors that they later named after him. In 2005, Vale instead began to endorse a juicer with Royal Philips Electronics.

Vale and his company Juice Master Ltd have branched out into running seminars, retreats, and juice bars. Vale opened his first juice detox retreat in Turkey in 2005 and organises health seminars across the United Kingdom and Ireland. In 2008, Vale opened his second Irish juice bar in John Roberts Square in Waterford.

== Media appearances ==
Vale began his TV career as a manager on Channel 4's The Fit Farm and has since appeared on This Morning, GMTV and numerous times on Five's The Wright Stuff. Vale has appeared in Irish media on The Ray D'Arcy Show, The Gerry Ryan Show, Studio One and popular culture show Xposé. Vale's promotion as The Juice Master by Royal Philips Electronics has achieved media attention in Denmark, Norway, The Netherlands, Finland, Turkey, and Italy.

Vale worked with Katie Price whom he claims to have helped lose two stone in three months, after the birth of her second child, on Vale's Turbo Charge programme.

== Bibliography ==
- Vale, Jason (1999). Stop Drinking 4 Life Easily!. Birmingham: Juice Master Publications. p. 240 pages. ISBN 0-9547664-0-7.
- Vale, Jason (2002). Slim 4 Life. London: Harper Thorsons. p. 256 pages. ISBN 0-00-713303-0.
- Vale, Jason (2003). The Juice Master's Ultimate Fast Food. London: Harper Thorsons. p. 256 pages. ISBN 0-00-715679-0.
- Vale, Jason (2004). Chocolate Busters: The Easy Way to Kick It. London: Harper Thorsons. p. 240 pages. ISBN 0-00-716400-9.
- Vale, Jason (2005). The Juice Master: turbo-charge your life in 14 days. London: Harper Thorsons. p. 256 pages. ISBN 0-00-719422-6.
- Vale, Jason (2006). 7lbs in 7 days super juice diet. London: Harper Thorsons. p. 224 pages. ISBN 0-00-723147-4.
- Vale, Jason (2007). The Juice Master Juice Yourself Slim: The Healthy Way To Lose Weight Without Dieting. London: Harper Thorsons. p. 304 pages. ISBN 978-0-00-726714-9.
- Vale, Jason (2008). The Juice Master Keeping It Simple: Over 100 Delicious Juices and Smoothies. London: Harper Thorsons. p. 304 pages. ISBN 978-0-00-726714-9.
- Vale, Jason (2011). Kick the Drink...Easily!. London: Crown House Publishing. p. 304 pages. ISBN 9781-845903909.
- Vale, Jason (2011). The Funky Fresh Juice Book. London: Juice Master Publications. p. 256 pages. ISBN 978-0-9547664-1-2.
- Vale, Jason (2014). 5LBs in 5 Days: The Juice Detox Diet. London: HarperCollins. p. 304 pages. ISBN 978-0007555895.
- Vale, Jason (2014). Super Juice Me!: 28 Day Juice Plan. London: Juice Master Publications. p. 424 pages. ISBN 978-0954766450.
- Vale, Jason (2015). Jason Vale's 5:2 Juice Diet. London: Juice Master Publications. p. 256 pages. ISBN 978-0954766467.
- Vale, Jason (2016). Super Fast Food: No Chef Required!. London: Juice Master Publications. p. 272 pages. ISBN 978-0954766474.

=== CD/DVDs ===
- Vale, Jason (2003). Slim 4 Life: Re-Tuning CD. Birmingham: Juice Master Publications.
- Vale, Jason (2006). 7lbs in 7 days super juice diet CD. Birmingham: Juice Master Publications.
- Vale, Jason (2006). 7lbs in 7 days super juice diet DVD. Birmingham: Juice Master Publications.
- Vale, Jason (2007). Keeping It Simple DVD. Birmingham: Juice Master Publications.
- Vale, Jason (2007). The Juice Master's Rebounding Workout DVD. Birmingham: Juice Master Publications.
