= Cesati =

Cesati is an Italian surname. Notable people with the surname include:

- Roberto Cesati (born 1957), Italian footballer
- Vincenzo de Cesati (1806–1883), Italian botanist

== See also ==
- Cesari
