= Steam juicer =

Kitchen utensil

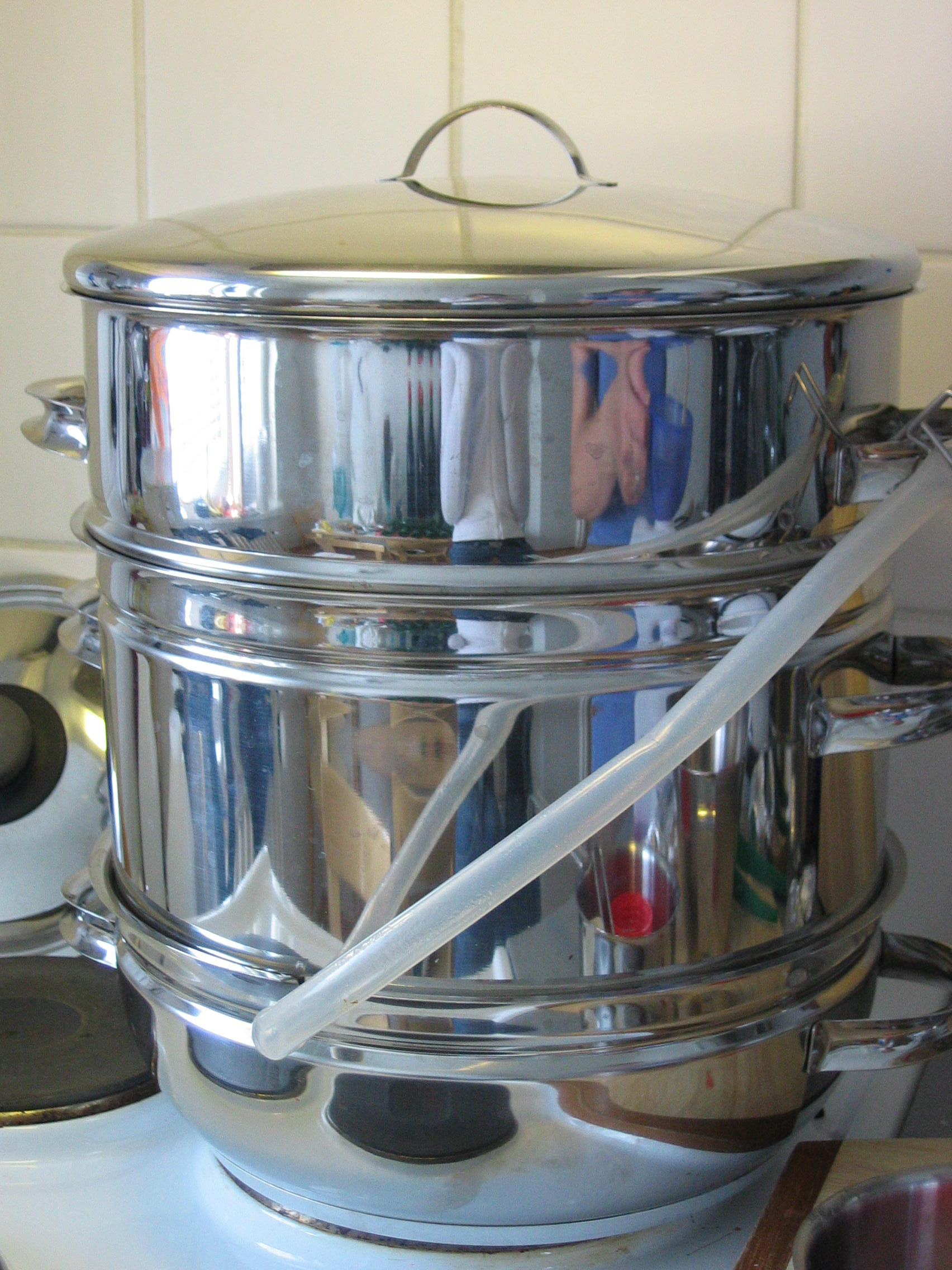
A typical three part steam juicer ready for use.

A steam juicer (steam extractor) is a household kitchen utensil for separating juice from berries, fruits, and some types of vegetables in a process called steam juice extraction that is primarily used for preserving harvests faster than they can be consumed when fresh.

== Operation ==
It makes use of steam to transfer gentle heat directly to the berries that are supported above a boiling water pot in a perforated basket. The juice is collected in the middle section and let out with a small hose while still hot and sterile directly into clean bottles for long term unrefrigerated storage. The quality of the juice is high with few solids due to the non-mechanical extraction process.

The units are generally made in a three-tier configuration that somewhat resembles a huge double boiler. The bottom section is a simple pot placed on a kitchen hot plate or gas range to boil water to generate the steam for the process. The next section is the juice collection container with an opening in the middle to pass the steam through. It has a hose fitting that is used to drain it directly into storage bottles. The top section is a perforated basket (with a loose-fitting lid) to hold the berries while allowing the steam to reach the complete batch but holding the berries (pulp, skins and pips) out of the extracted juice.

The process is convenient and as safe as any other stove-top cooking. The steam is not held under pressure and the juice is delivered with a rubber hose that requires minimal extra operations, occasionally a funnel with a strainer may be used to make the bottling more convenient. As usual one needs to be careful of scalding hot juice and the possibility of pulling over the tall juicer.

When loading the charge of berries into the strainer section sugar may be added (in alternating layers) the amount depending on the projected use, sugar also acts as a preservative. Other additives may be pectin to prepare jellies, ascorbic acid to improve shelf life and other ingredients that will dissolve and mix with the juice as it is extracted. To get a consistent batch of juice the whole charge is allowed to extract and then bottled when complete; draining of the juice as it extracts will result in different compositions from start to end of the batch. Long dwell times in juicers made from aluminium when preparing acid juices is not recommended.

Increasing the steam flow-rate may improve the juice extraction rate.

== History ==
This was a popular type of harvest juicer as it prepared the juice for immediate bottling in good sized batches. There is generally no need to strain or boil the juice after mechanical juicing and it could be operated over a wood stove in the rural countryside.

They are still popular in Finland and elsewhere and have been marketed under various names (Mehu Maija, MehuLiisa, MehuMatti, Krona) by various manufacturers (OY Alu AB, Hackmann, Opa, Victorio, Lehmann, Norpro) over the years. The same style of juicer has also been historically made in Germany and Portugal and now in China. Some of the modern units incorporate an electrical heating element in the steam generating pot that makes for very convenient operation away from the kitchen where small spills and hot stoves are not a problem.

The first units were probably made from aluminum due to the ease of fabrication of the complex shapes by metal spinning. Some have been made from enamelled steel (a German trend) and the modern bare metal units have moved to stainless steel alloys to prevent aluminium from leaching into the juice at the time of preparation.

== Uses ==
The steam juicer is eminently well suited to preparing berry juices at the time of harvest for long term preservation due to the pasteurization that results from the extraction process.

They are also used to make jellies and cook vegetables in the tradition of a normal steamer or blanching for freezer storage.

They have been used as emergency distillation units for preparing clean water and medicinal alcohol.

== See also ==
- Juicer
- Juicing
