= The Kids Menu =

- Theatrical release poster
- Directed by: Kurt Engfehr
- Written by: Kurt Engfehr; Jamin Mendelsohn
- Produced by: Jamin Mendelsohn
- Cinematography: Kurt Engfehr
- Edited by: Kurt Engfehr; Olaf Steel
- Music by: Gary Meister
- Release date: April 1, 2016 (United States)
- Running time: 88 minutes
- Country: United States
- Language: English

The Kids Menu is a 2016 American documentary film that discusses the growing problem of childhood obesity. It is produced by Australian filmmaker Joe Cross, who co-created Fat, Sick and Nearly Dead, and directed by Kurt Engfehr.

== Content ==
The Kids Menu advocates informed dietary choices while promoting fruits, vegetables, whole grains and unprocessed foods. Cross focuses on educating children about nutrition and searching for accessible ways for them to learn about healthy foods and transform their diets. The film features interviews from leading health experts who offer advice about healthy food alternatives and access to healthy and affordable options, and explores the influence of role models such as parents, teachers and celebrities, proposing that childhood obesity is in fact a symptom of a bigger problem. It also asks key questions about the causes of childhood obesity and comorbidities and works to raise consciousness about health and wellness. To educate children about food and nutrition, The Kids Menu introduces several programs in schools and communities around the United States, including the East Hampton Wellness Foundation and the Encinitas Union School District's health and wellness program. The film highlights teachers, parents, scientists and activists raising awareness of nutritional needs and encouraging children to participate in healthy eating. It features Tim Baird, Jennifer Bond, Cross, Curt Ellis, Eliza Fournier, Deb Grant, Sam Kass, Michel Nischan, Rachael Ray, Brian Wansink and Janet Wojcicki.

== Reception ==
The film has received generally favorable reviews for its contribution to raising awareness about childhood obesity. Common Sense Media stated that "it's informative and confident that change is possible, and [the film] offers positive, viable solutions." The film holds a rating of 40% from the review aggregator Rotten Tomatoes. Although Food & Nutrition noticed that "it was also unfortunate to see school lunch only briefly touched on and in a negative light", they praised the film, stating that it "does a great job at highlighting the potential influences that communities, teachers and parents have on childhood obesity, which can hopefully help formulate ideas and programs that can be implemented at all levels."
