= Jaipan Industries =

Jaipan Industries Limited
- Type: Public
- Traded as: BSE: 505840
- Industry: Home appliances
- Founded: 1984
- Founder: J.N. Agarwal
- Headquarters: Mumbai, Maharashtra, India
- Key people: Shri J. N. Agarwal (Chairman) Mr. Atin Agarwal, (Managing Director)
- Products: Food processor, Mixer, Juicer, Hand mixer, Blender, Iron, Sandwich toaster, Pop-up toaster, Roti maker, Mechanical fan, Home theatre, Gas heater, Gas burner, Water purifier, Vacuum cleaner
- Total equity: 7.5 crore
- Website: Official Website

Jaipan Industries Limited is Indian home appliances company based in Mumbai, Maharashtra, India. It manufactures and markets various Home Appliances and Non stick cookware's under the brand name of Jaipan. It is also manufactures of consumer durable products and Mobile handsets. It also markets its products in a number of countries like Sri Lanka, Mauritius, Bangladesh, Nepal, U.A.E. It has more than 140 products, 125 distributors and more than 6000 dealers across India. Its products include food processors, mixers, juicers, hand mixers, blenders, irons, sandwich toasters, pop-up toasters, roti makers, mechanical fans, home theatres, gas heaters, gas burners, water purifiers, vacuum cleaners, tea kettles, rice cookers, dutch ovens, ovens, stainless cutlery and dinnersets.
