= Norman W. Walker =

British businessman

Norman Wardhaugh Walker (4 January 1886, Genoa, Italy – 6 June 1985, Cottonwood, Arizona) was a British businessman and pioneer in the field of vegetable juicing and nutritional health. He advocated the drinking of fresh raw vegetable and fruit juices for health. Based on his design, the Norwalk Hydraulic Press Juicer was developed. This juicer was produced until its manufacturer, Norwalk, Inc., located in Bentonville, Arkansas, ceased operations in October 2021. Walker was the author of at least 11 books on nutrition and healthy living, published from 1936 to 1981.

As of 2006, many book reviews and promotional websites wrongly claim that Walker reached the age of, variously, 109, 113, 116, 118, or 119 years. Several official sources, including the US Social Security Death Index and a grave marker all indicate that he lived to be 99 years of age.

== Biography ==
I can truthfully say that I am never conscious of my age. Since I reached maturity, I have never been aware of being any older, and I can say, without equivocation or mental reservation, that I feel more alive, alert, and full of enthusiasm today than I did when I was 30 years old. I still feel my best years are ahead of me. I never think of birthdays, nor do I celebrate them. Today I can truthfully say that I am enjoying vibrant health, I don't mind telling people how old I am: I AM AGELESS!"

— Norman W. Walker

Walker was born in Genoa, Liguria, Italy on 4 January 1886 to Robert Walker, a Baptist minister from Scotland, and Lydia Maw Walker. He was the second of the six children of Rev. and Mrs. Walker that lived to adulthood. As a young man, he discovered the value of vegetable juices while recovering from a breakdown in a peasant house in the French countryside. Watching a woman in the kitchen peel carrots, he noticed the moistness on the underside of the peel. He decided to grind them, and had his first cup of carrot juice.

Walker followed his parents and siblings to the United States, leaving England in 1910 on the S.S. Lusitania, and arriving in New York City in October of that year, where Walker worked at various occupations (although he gave his occupation as "painter" in his immigration interview). Although Walker has never shown up in any publicly released Federal Censuses, he and wife Margaret were enumerated in both the interim New York State Censuses of 1915 and 1925, where his birthplace was stated as "Italy" and occupations given for him as "janitor" and "real estate", respectively.

Norman W. Walker married Margaret Bruce Olcott, a New Yorker, on 11 June 1913 in New York City [New York State Marriage Index (on-line), Marriage Certificate No.13485]. Margaret Walker died in New York City in November 1970 (NY Times obituary and Social Security Death Index). It is not known when and where Norman and Margaret divorced, but the 18 January 1943 issue of the Reno (NV) Evening Gazette reported a Marriage Application for Norman W. Walker of San Francisco and Helen Ruth Kerby of Carson City. There is no indication Walker had children from either marriage.

On 22 November 1918, Walker was granted US citizenship by the New York State Court.

On 6 May 1933, The New York Times reported that "An indeterminate penitentiary term of not more than three years was imposed by Judge Allen in General Sessions yesterday on Norman Walker, 47 years old...." This was the fifth NY Times article in this matter, commencing in 1932. The original charges involved advertisements placed in the New York Times by Walker, as managing director for The Broughton Institute of Ortho-Dietetics in NY City, wherein he allegedly promised employment with this school following completion of a six-weeks course. Neither employment nor requested return of the $150 tuition followed. According to a Probation Officer testifying at the Walker trial, 30 graduated students lost a total of $4,500 (approximately $80,000 in 2015 dollars per CPI calculation). It is currently unknown how much incarceration time, if any, Walker actually served.

Later, Walker moved to Long Beach, California. With a medical doctor, he opened a juice bar and offered home delivery service. By 1930, they had devised dozens of fresh juice formulas for specific conditions. Walker believed colon cleansing with fresh juices was the key to good health. Believing hand juicers to be insufficient, Walker designed his own mechanical juicer, the Norwalk, in two parts – a grinder to slowly grind the vegetables and a press to extract the juice. When the San Francisco health department banned unpasteurised vegetable juices such as Walker's, he began manufacturing his juice machine in Anaheim, California. He kept the plant going in spite of the steel shortage during World War II.

In the late 1940s, he moved to St. George, Utah, where he found an old cotton mill, ideal for his juice plant, but he was again suppressed by local health department regulations. He sold his share of the factory to his business partner and started publication of his own health magazine, The New Health Movement Review. For several years, Walker ran a health ranch in Arizona. Eventually, he gave up the ranch and devoted himself entirely to writing.

Walker observed a raw food diet, with fresh raw juices, until his death. Although claims have been made that he was both physically and mentally healthy and active up to the day of his death when he peacefully died during his sleep one night at his home in Cottonwood, Yavapai County, Arizona, no "official" evidence of such claims, such as an Arizona death certificate, have, so far, ever publicly surfaced.

== Nutritional views ==
Walker advocated a diet based solely on raw and fresh foods like vegetables, fruits, nuts, and seeds. He considered cooked or baked food dead, and therefore unhealthful, saying that "while such food can, and does, sustain life in the human system, it does so at the expense of progressively degenerating health, energy, and vitality." His attitude to frozen foods, however, was an accepting one, as he did not believe low-temperatures would kill enzymes. He did not recommend eating meat, dairy products with the exception of raw goat milk, fish, or eggs. However, some of his recipes include egg yolks, unpasteurized cottage cheese and Swiss cheese, as well as raw cream. His diet suggestions avoided such staple foods as bread, pasta, rice, and sugar.

Walker devoted large sections of many of his books to the description of the different organs of the human body, explaining how the digestive system and the various glands work. He considered a healthy colon the key to one's health. He estimated that 80% of all disease begins in the colon. He wrote: "Every organ, gland, and cell in the body is affected by the condition of the colon."

Walker believed that the affliction underlying almost every ailment is constipation, stating that constipation is "the primary cause of nearly every disturbance of the human system." This was, in his view, because the blood vessels lining the colon collect nutrients missed by the small intestine. In his book, Pure and Simple Natural Weight Control, Walker stated: "If the feces in the colon have putrefied and fermented, any nutritional elements present in it would pass into the bloodstream as polluted products. What would otherwise be nutritional instead generates toxemia, a condition in which the blood contains poisonous products which are produced by the growth of pathogenic or disease-producing bacteria." Pimples can be an indication of the presence of toxaemia. Walker maintained that the Standard American Diet causes the colon to be filled with toxins that strain the eliminative channels and, ultimately, the immune system.

Walker believed that dairy products especially had a deleterious effect on human health. He testified to the disappearance of many ailments upon the exclusion of dairy products. He explained that pathogenic organisms find an ideal breeding ground in the excess mucus that dairy products generate. He cited the following diseases as being aggravated or caused by mucus conditions in which dairy products are the major offender: undulant fever, colds, flu, bronchial troubles, tuberculosis, asthma, hay fever, sinus trouble, pneumonia, and certain types of arthritis.

His writings reflect a wide interest in different aspects of health and nutrition; besides authoring eight books, he also produced three wall charts. Walker's work influenced later juice advocates such as Jason Vale in the UK, otherwise known as The Juice Master, and Jay Kordich, who popularised "juicing" in the United States with extensive television advertising in the 1990s.

== Controversial academic title claims ==
Several of Walker's books mention him having a DSc degree and the title page of his book Colon Health even mentions him as having a PhD as well. However, no mention is made as to where and when he actually earned or was awarded these academic titles.

== Works ==
- Raw Vegetable Juices: What's Missing in Your Body? (1936) A revision of this book was published in 1978 under the title Fresh Vegetable and Fruit Juices: What's Missing in Your Body?
- Diet & Salad Suggestions, for use in connection with vegetable and fruit juices (1940, revised and enlarged edition 1947) Another revision of this book was published in 1971 under the title The Vegetarian Guide to Diet and Salad
- Become Younger (1949)
- Your Fountain of Health --- Fresh Fruit and Vegetable Juices (1951) 43 page paperback; minor work compared with the others listed here
- Alive Today because... (1951) 32 page paperback; minor work compared with the others listed here
- Are You Slipping? (1961)
- The Natural Way to Vibrant Health (1972)
- Water Can Undermine Your Health (1974)
- Back to the Land ... for Self Preservation: a freedom, life-style, and nutritional commentary (1977)
- Colon Health: the Key to a Vibrant Life (1979)
- Pure & Simple Natural Weight Control (1981)
- Wall charts: Endocrine Chart – Foot Relaxation Chart – Colon Therapy Chart

== See also ==
- Herbert Shelton
- Orthopathy
