= CRTV =

CRTV may refer to:

- Open University of China (formerly China Central Radio and TV University)
- Cameroon Radio Television
- Conservative Review Television
- CreaTV San Jose
- CRTV (Cesari Response Television), founded by Rick Cesari
- CRTV (Consumer Response Television), owned by Cannella Media
