= Apple juice =

Juice produced from apples

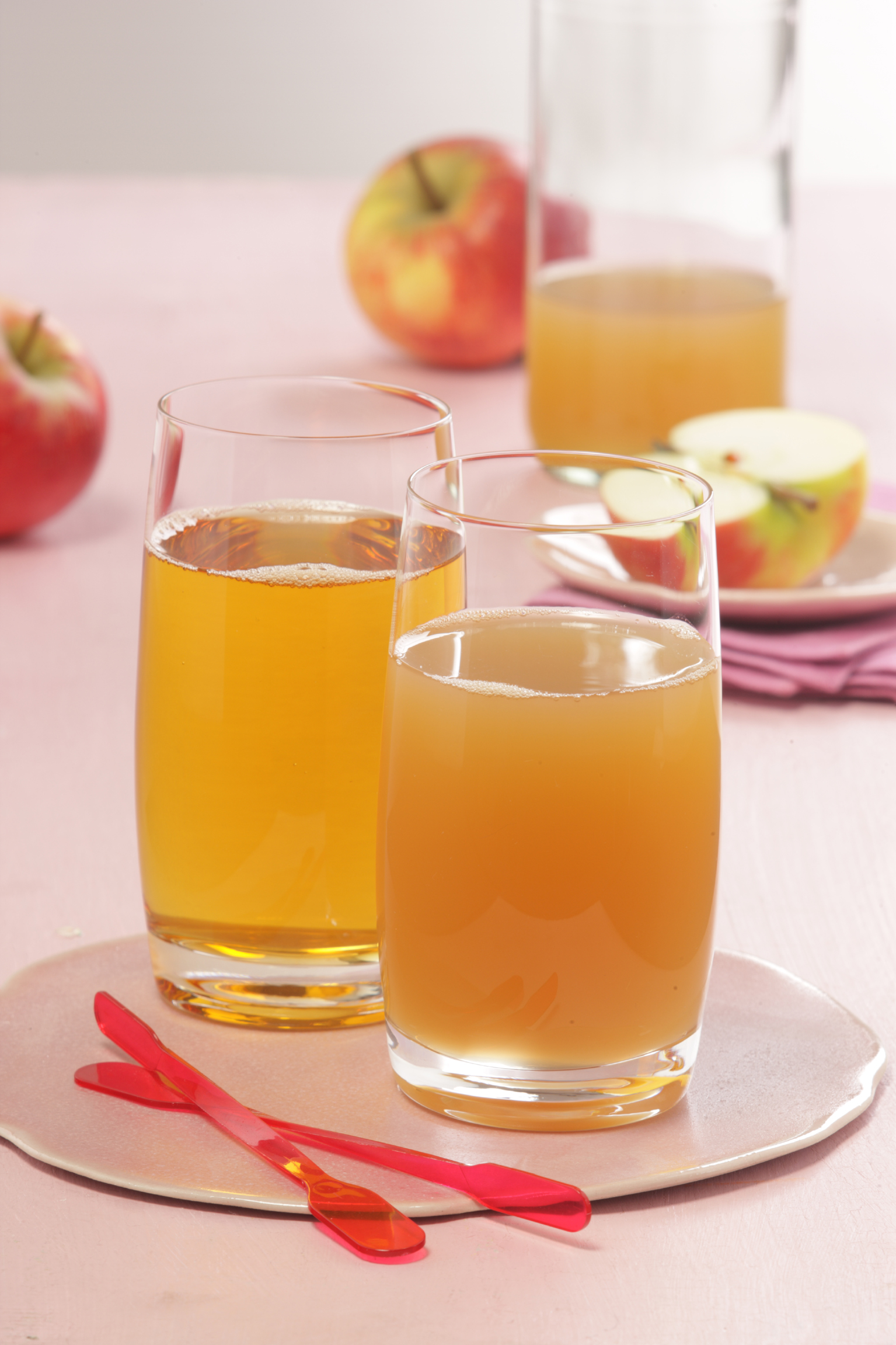
Filtered and unfiltered apple juice

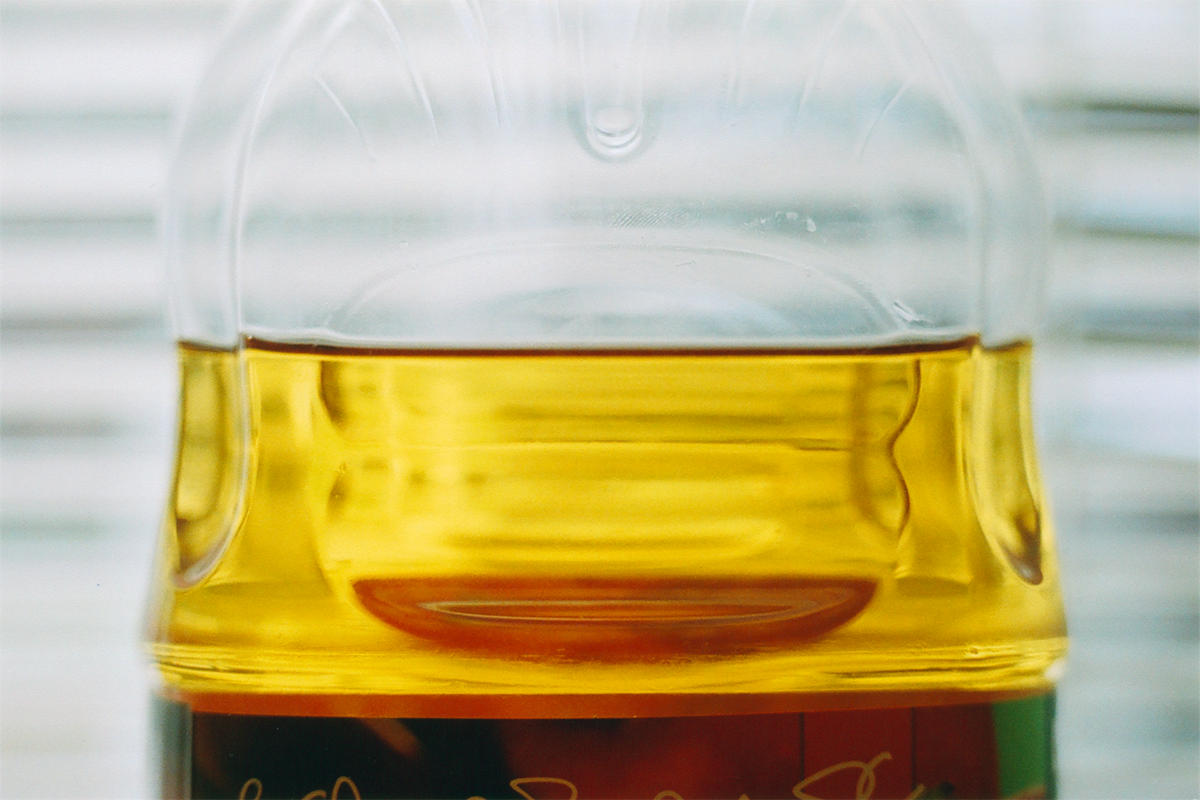
Clarified apple juice, from which pectin and starch have been removed, in a plastic bottle

Apple juice is a fruit juice made by the maceration and pressing of an apple. The resulting expelled juice may be further treated by enzymatic and centrifugal clarification to remove the starch and pectin, which hold fine particulate in suspension, and then pasteurized for packaging in glass, metal, or aseptic processing system containers, or further treated by dehydration processes to a concentrate.

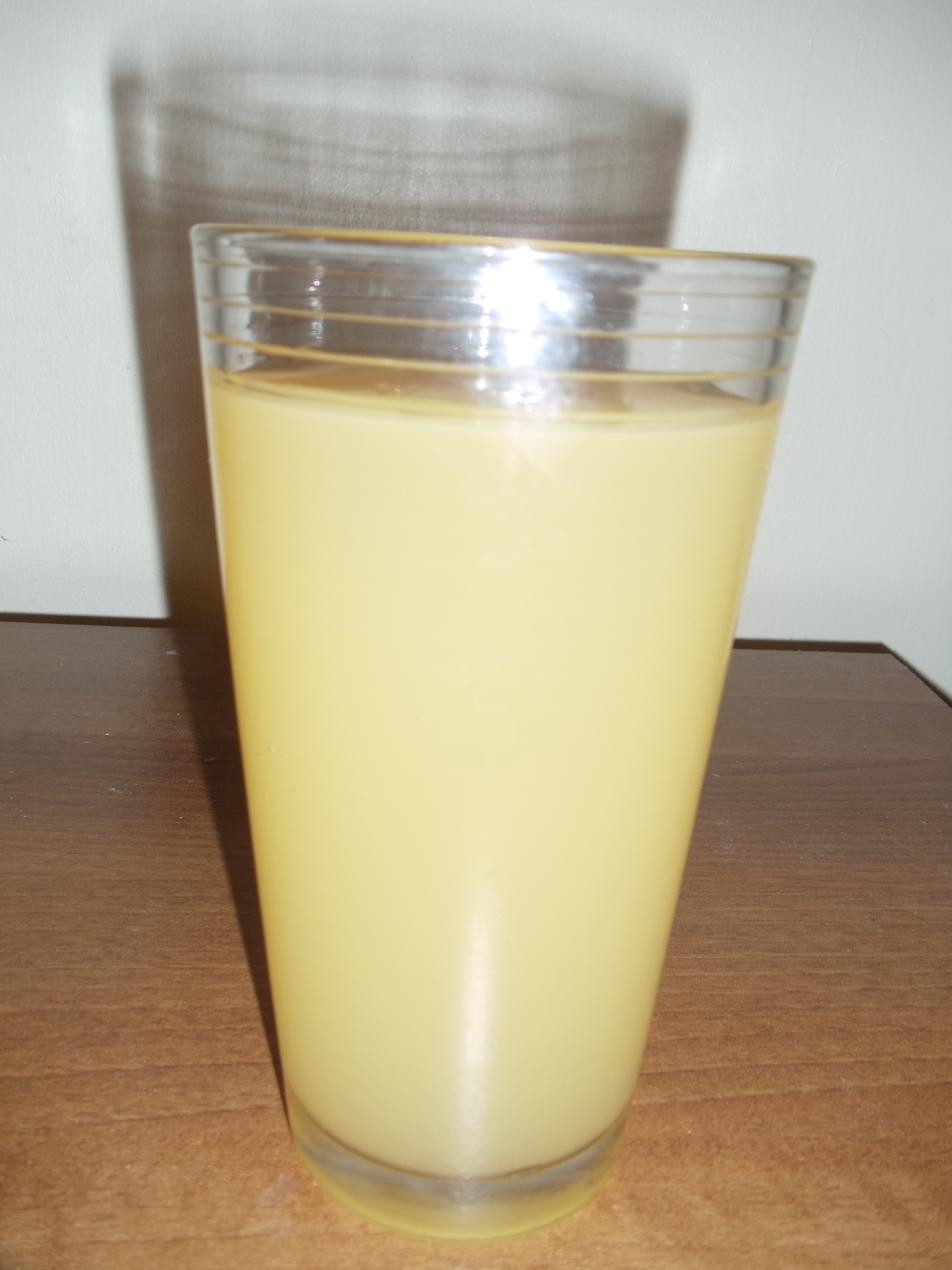
Russet apple juice from Bolney, Mid Sussex, England, in a glass

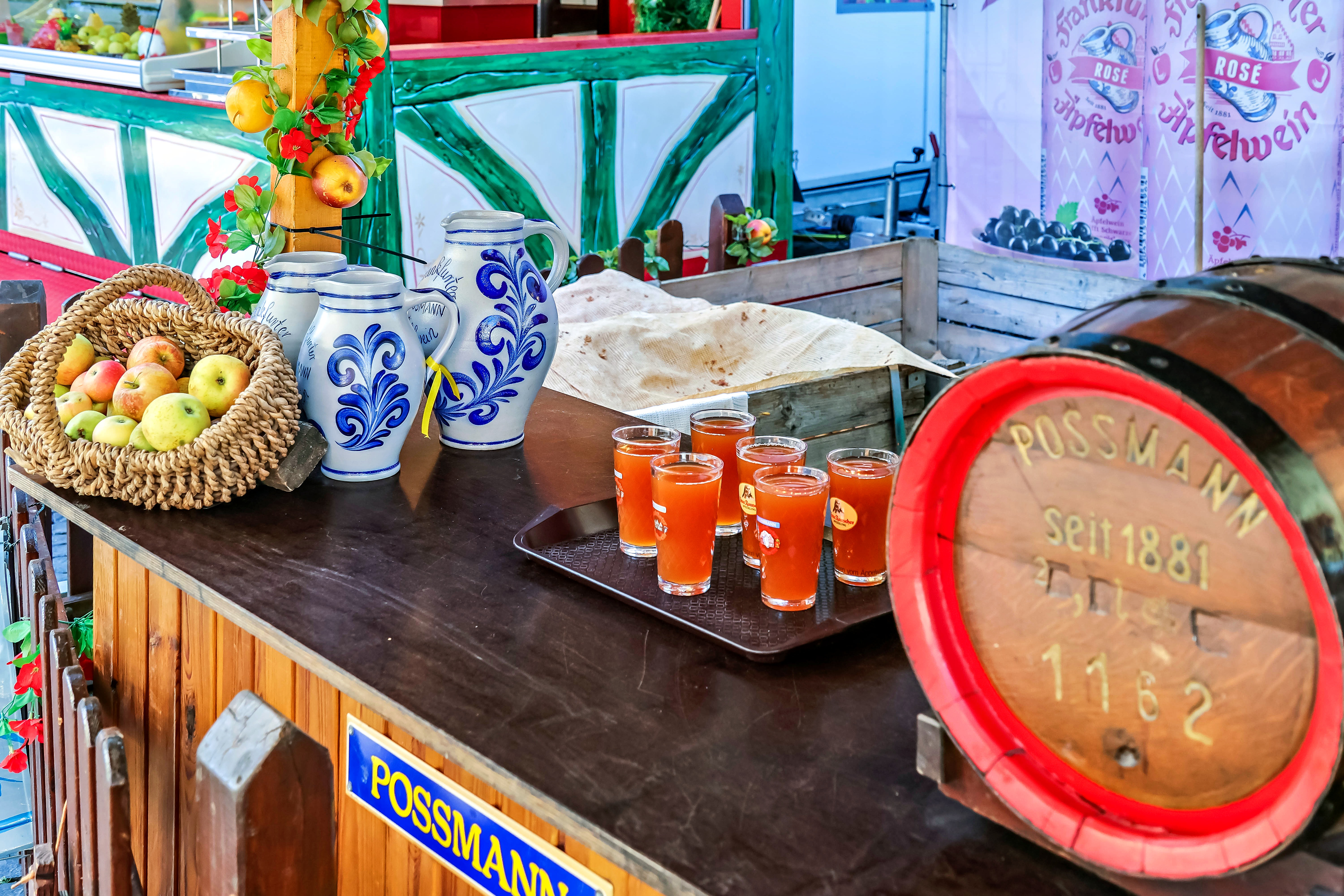
Apple juice tasting in Frankfurt

Because the equipment required to extract and clarify apple juice in large volumes is complex and costly, apple juice is normally produced commercially. In the United States, unfiltered fresh apple juice is produced by smaller operations in regions with high apple production, in the form of unclarified apple cider. Apple juice is one of the most common fruit juices globally, with world production led by China, Poland, the United States, and Germany.

== Production ==
Apples used for apple juice are usually harvested between September and mid-November in the Northern Hemisphere and between February and mid-April in the Southern Hemisphere. A common cultivar used for apple juice is the McIntosh. Approximately two medium McIntosh apples produce around 200 millilitres (7.0 imp fl oz; 6.8 US fl oz) of juice. After the apples are picked, they are washed and transported to the processing facility. The apples are then pressed and juiced right away to avoid spoilage. Depending on the company and end-product, the apples can be processed in different ways before pressing. Apple juice is then filtered, with the number of solid particles remaining partly defining the difference between apple juice and apple cider. In cases where the apple juice is treated enzymatically, the typical class of enzymes used is pectinases.

== Pasteurization ==
Because apple juice is acidic, typically with a pH of 3.4, it can be pasteurized for less time or at lower temperatures than many other juices. For this purpose, the U.S. Food and Drug Administration recommends the following thermal processing times and temperatures in order to achieve a five-log reduction of Cryptosporidium parvum as this parasite is more heat resistant than E. coli 0157:

- 160 °F (71 °C) for at least 6 seconds
- 165 °F (74 °C) for at least 2.8 seconds
- 170 °F (77 °C) for at least 1.3 seconds
- 175 °F (79 °C) for at least 0.6 second
- 180 °F (82 °C) for at least 0.3 second

=== Unpasteurized juice and foodborne illnesses ===
From 2000 to 2010, there were over 1700 cases in North America of illnesses related to drinking unpasteurized juice and cider. The pathogens responsible for these foodborne illnesses included parasites, bacteria, and viruses. The most common pathogens were E. coli 0157 and 0111, Salmonella, Cryptosporidium, Clostridium botulinum, and hepatitis A. Pathogens can spread in several ways, such as through contamination at the point of growth, via contaminated containers, or through poor handling and washing.

== Composition and nutrition ==
Apple juice is 88% water and 11% carbohydrates (including 10% sugars), with negligible content of protein or fat. A 100 ml reference amount of unsweetened apple juice supplies 46 calories and low content of micronutrients.

== Storage ==
Fresh apple juice requires refrigeration. Sealed bottles of canned apple juice can be stored in a dark, cool place, such as a pantry or cupboard, to slow degradation. The appearance, texture, or taste of the juice might change over time.

Once the juice package is opened, or if it was not sealed and shipped without refrigeration by the manufacturer, it must be resealed tightly and refrigerated to prevent contamination by microorganisms such as bacteria. The ideal storage temperature for apple juice is between 0 °C (32 °F) and 4 °C (39 °F).

== Apple cider ==
While apple juice generally refers to the filtered, pasteurized product of apple pressing, an unfiltered, sometimes unpasteurized version of the juice is commonly known as "apple cider" in the United States and parts of Canada. Seeking to capitalize on this, some makers of filtered and clarified juice (including carbonated varieties) label and sell their product as "apple cider." Legal distinctions are not universal and are elusive to apply.

== See also ==
- Juicing
- List of juices
- Malic acid
