= Cesari =

Cesari is an Italian surname. Notable people with the surname include:

- Bernardino Cesari (1565–1621), Italian painter
- Bruno Cesari (1933–2004), Italian art decorator
- Federico Cesari (born 1997), Italian actor
- Giovanni Cesari (1843–1904), Italian singer
- Giuseppe Cesari (c. 1568 – 1640), Italian mannerist painter
- Lamberto Cesari (1910–1990), Italian mathematician
- Rick Cesari, advertising producer
- Velleda Cesari (1920–2003), Italian fencer
