= Apple cider =

Non-alcoholic apple beverage

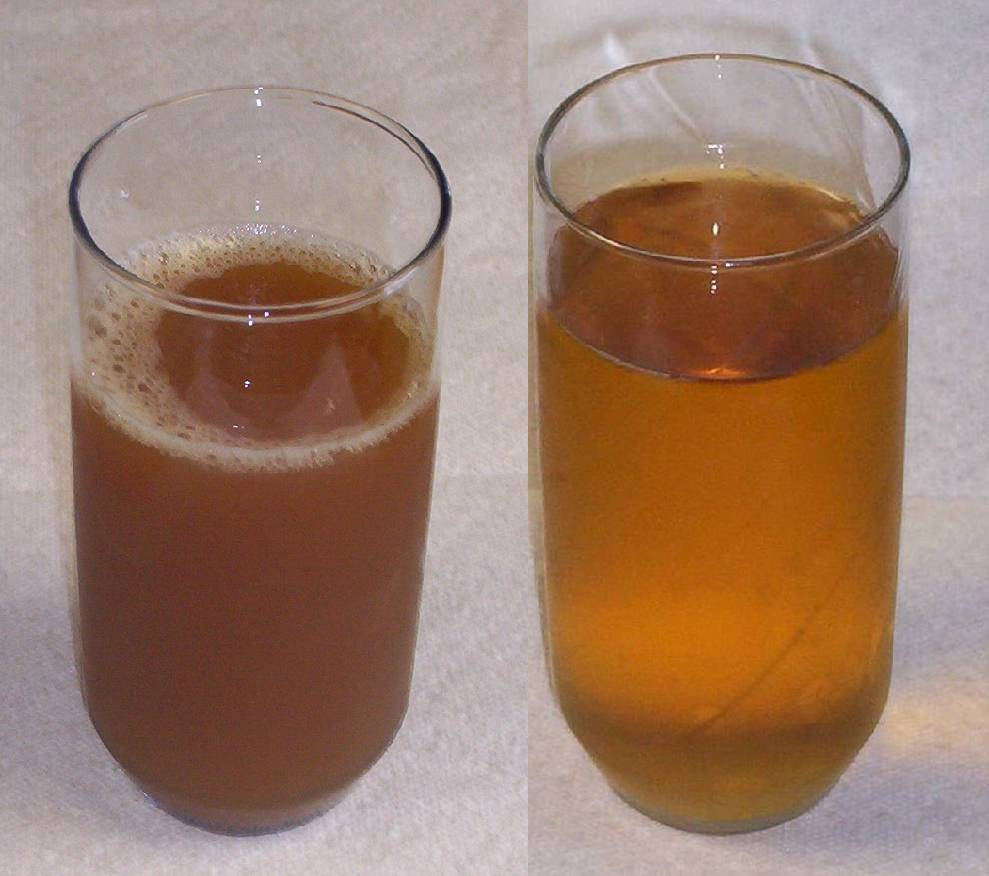
Apple cider (left) is an unfiltered, unsweetened apple juice. Most present-day apple juice (right) is filtered (and pasteurized).

Apple cider (also called sweet cider, soft cider, or simply cider) is the name used in the United States and Canada for an unfiltered, unsweetened, non-alcoholic beverage made from apples. Apple cider should not be confused with the alcoholic beverage known as cider in the rest of the world, which is called "hard cider" in the US and Canada. Outside of the United States and Canada, it is commonly referred to as cloudy apple juice to distinguish it from clearer, filtered apple juice and hard cider.

Fresh liquid cider is extracted from whole apples, including the cores, trimmings, and oddly sized or shaped "imperfect" apples, or apple culls. Fresh cider is opaque due to fine apple particles in suspension and is generally tangier than commercially cooked and filtered apple juice, though this depends somewhat on the apple variety used. Cider is sometimes pasteurized or exposed to UV light to kill bacteria and extend its shelf life, but traditional raw untreated cider is still common. Some companies have begun adding preservatives and boiling cider so that it can be shelf-stable and stored without refrigeration. In either form, apple cider is seasonally produced in autumn. It is traditionally served on Halloween, Thanksgiving, Christmas, and New Year's Eve, sometimes heated and mulled.

== Nomenclature ==
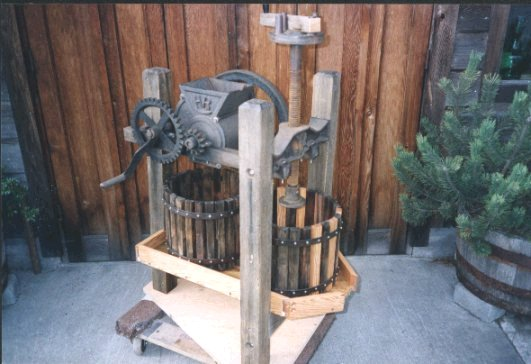
A vintage combination apple grinder and press. Moving slatted baskets left to right allows simultaneous two-person production.

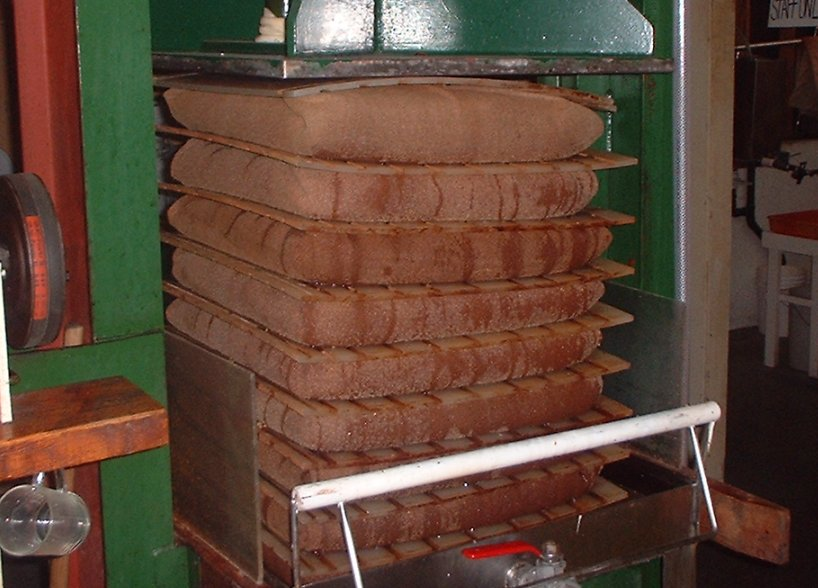
A small scale hydraulic apple press. Each load produces about 140 US gallons (530 L)

Although the term "cider" is used for the fermented alcoholic drink in much of the world, it often refers to fresh "apple cider" in North America; hard cider is used there instead when referring to the alcoholic drink. In much of the U.S. and Canada, the fresh variety is often referred to as "apple cider" with "cider" alone referring to the alcoholic variety.

While some states specify a difference between apple juice and cider, the distinction is not well established across the U.S. Massachusetts makes an attempt to at least differentiate fresh raw cider and processed, cooked apple juice; according to its Department of Agricultural Resources,

apple juice and apple cider are both fruit beverages made from apples, but there is a difference between the two. Fresh cider is raw apple juice that has not undergone a filtration process to remove coarse particles of pulp or sediment. Apple juice is juice that has been cooked and filtered to remove solids, and pasteurized so that it will stay fresh longer. Vacuum sealing and additional filtering extend the shelf life of apple juice.

This still leaves unfiltered apple juice that is no longer raw in a gray area, presumably cider but not labeled as such. The addition of sweeteners or reconstitution from concentrate leaves it even grayer.

Canada recognizes unfiltered, unsweetened apple juice as cider, fresh or not.

== Natural cider ==
Historically, all cider was left in its natural state, raw and unprocessed. In time, airborne yeasts present on apple skins or cider-making machinery would start fermentation in the finished cider. Left on its own, alcohol would inhibit the growth of harmful bacteria. When modern refrigeration emerged, cider and other fruit juices could be kept cold or frozen for long periods, slowing fermentation. Any interruption of the refrigeration, however, could allow bacterial contamination to grow. Outbreaks of illness resulted in some state government regulations requiring any commercially produced cider to be treated either with heat or UV radiation.

As a result, natural raw cider is a specialty seasonal beverage, produced on-site at orchards and small rural mills in apple-growing areas and sold there, at farmers markets, and at some juice bars. Such traditional cider is typically made from a mixture of several different apples to give a balanced taste. Frequently, blends of heirloom varieties such as Jonathan and Winesap, once among the most sought-after cider apples for tangy flavor, are used. Many US states now require that unpasteurized cider have a warning label on the bottle.

Even with refrigeration, raw cider will become slightly carbonated within a few weeks and eventually become hard cider as fermentation continues. Some producers use this fermentation to make hard cider; others carry it further on to acetification and create artisanal apple cider vinegar.

== Treated cider ==
Many commercially produced ciders are pasteurized or have artificial preservatives added which extends their shelf life; the most common method used is pasteurization, but UV irradiation is also employed.

Pasteurization, which partially cooks the juice, results in some change in the sweetness, body, and flavor of the cider; UV radiation has less noticeable effects. Cooking cider and adding chemical preservatives have allowed many ciders to be transported and sold without refrigeration.

Impetus for federal-level regulation began with outbreaks of E. coli O157:H7 from unpasteurized apple cider and other illnesses caused by contaminated fruit juices in the late 1990s. The U.S. Food and Drug Administration (FDA) made proposals in 1998; Canada began to explore regulation in 2000.

The U.S. regulations were finalized in 2001, with the FDA issuing a rule requiring that juice producers and most large cider producers follow Hazard Analysis and Critical Control Points (HACCP) controls, using either heat pasteurization, ultraviolet germicidal irradiation (UVGI), or other proven methods to achieve a 5-log reduction in pathogens.

Canada, however, relies on a voluntary Code of Practice for manufacturers, voluntary labeling of juice/cider as "Unpasteurized", and an education campaign to inform consumers about the potential health risks associated with consuming unpasteurized juice products.

== Commercial production ==
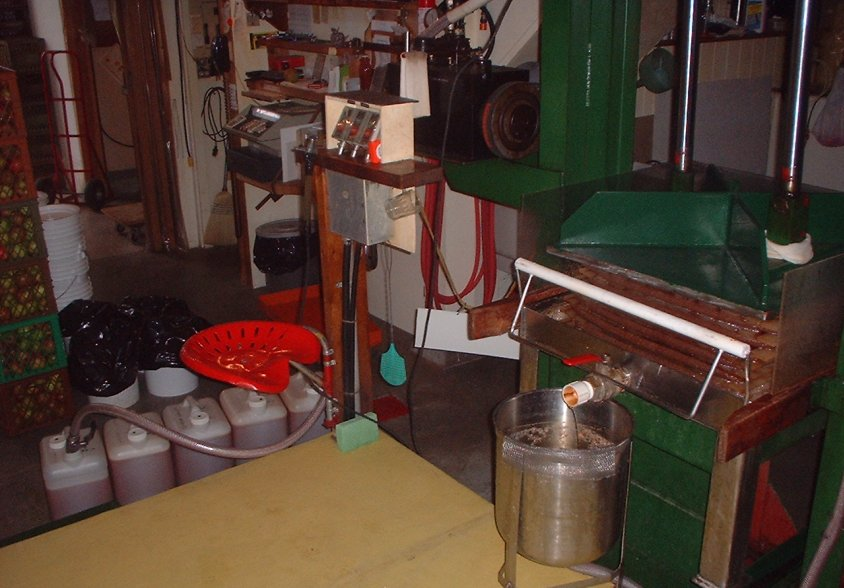
Cidering in a contemporary rural area mill. Custom batches pressed directly to bulk containers on demand.

Modern cider making has come a long way from early forms of production that involved a man- or horse-powered crusher. These consisted of a stone or wood trough with a heavy circulating wheel to crush the fruit, and a large manual screw press to express the juice from the pulp. Straw was commonly used to contain the pulp during pressing and was later replaced by coarse cloth. The Palmer Bros. Company, of Cos Cob, CT, made the most popular "modern" rack-and-cloth press from the mid-1800s to the mid-1900s, when production shifted to OESCO in Massachusetts. As technology advanced, rotary drum "scratters" came into use. Today, nearly all small pressing operations use electric-hydraulic equipment with press cloths and plastic racks in what is commonly called a "rack and cloth press", and electric hammermill "breakers".

Depending on the apple varieties and the extraction method used, it takes about one-third of a bushel (10 liters) to make a gallon (3.78 liters) of cider. Apples are washed, cut, and ground into a mash that has the consistency of coarse applesauce. Layers of this mash are then either wrapped in cloth and placed upon wooden or plastic racks where a hydraulic press then squeezes the layers together, or the mash is distributed onto a continuous belt filter press, which squeezes the pulp between two permeable belts fed between a succession of rollers that press the juice out of the pulp in a continuous, highly efficient operation. The resulting juice is then stored in refrigerated tanks, pasteurized to kill bacteria and extend shelf life, and bottled and sold as apple cider. The juice may also be fermented to produce hard cider, which may then be further treated by exposure to acetobacter to produce apple cider vinegar, or distilled to produce apple brandy. The waste left after pressing, known as pomace, is sold for cattle feed.

== Variations and derivatives ==
=== Non-alcoholic ===
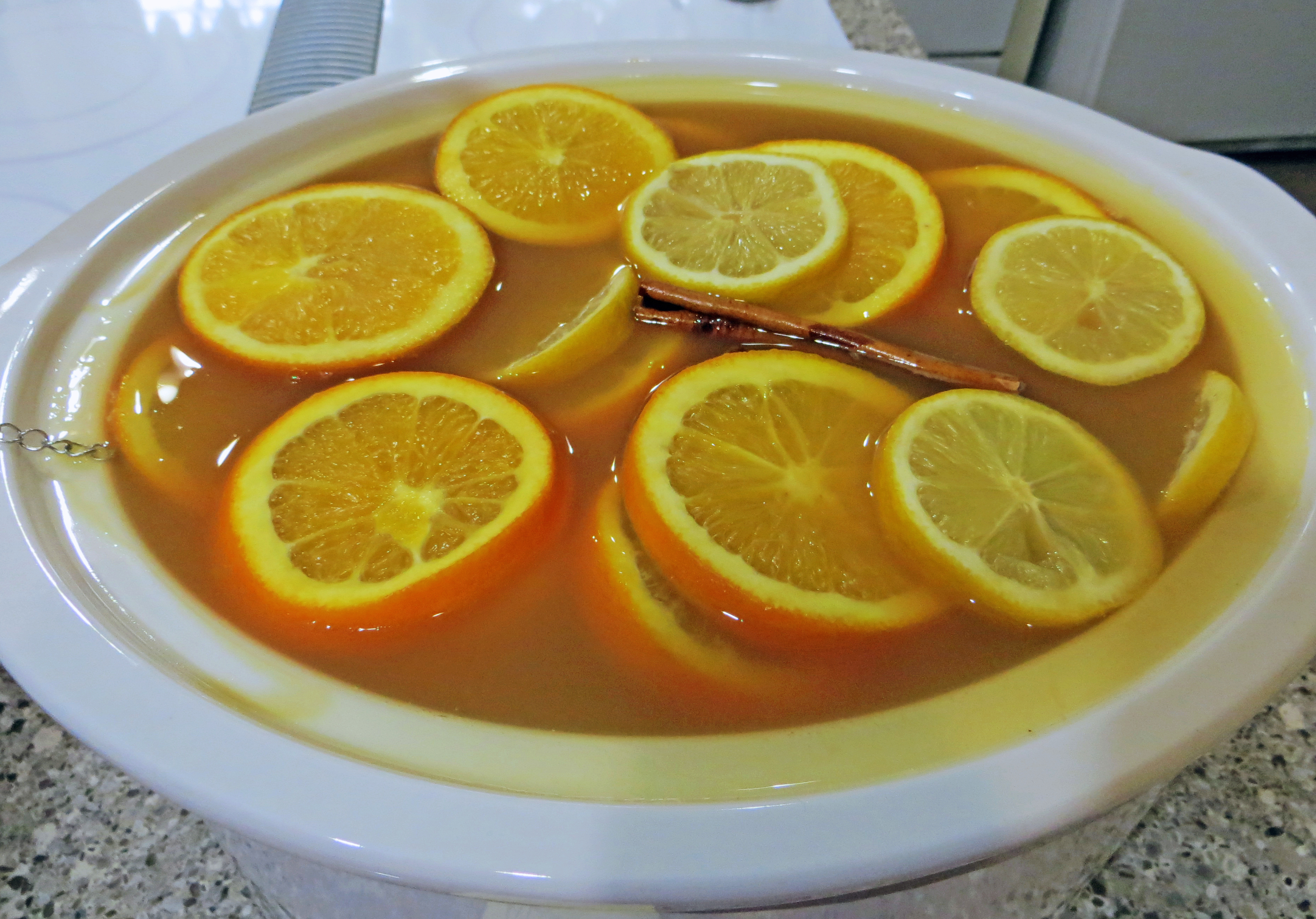
Hot mulled cider

Hot mulled cider, similar to "wassail", is a popular autumn and winter beverage. Cider is heated to a temperature just below boiling, with cinnamon, orange peel, nutmeg, cloves, or other spices added.

Rosé apple cider can be obtained using red-fleshed applecrabs.

"Cider doughnuts" traditionally used the yeast in raw cider as a leavener. Today they are sometimes sold at cider mills and roadside stands, though there is no assurance that natural cider is used. Visiting apple orchards in the fall for cider, doughnuts, and self-picked apples is a large segment in agritourism.

Chai spices can be added to apple cider to produce chaider.

=== Alcoholic ===
Apple cider may be used to produce hard apple cider, apple wine, applejack, or apple brandy, among other possibilities.

== Cultural significance ==
Apple cider is the official beverage of the U.S. state of New Hampshire.

== See also ==
- Apple cider cookie
- List of apple dishes
- List of hot drinks
- Must
- Styre
