= Mulling spices =

Spice mixture used in drink recipes

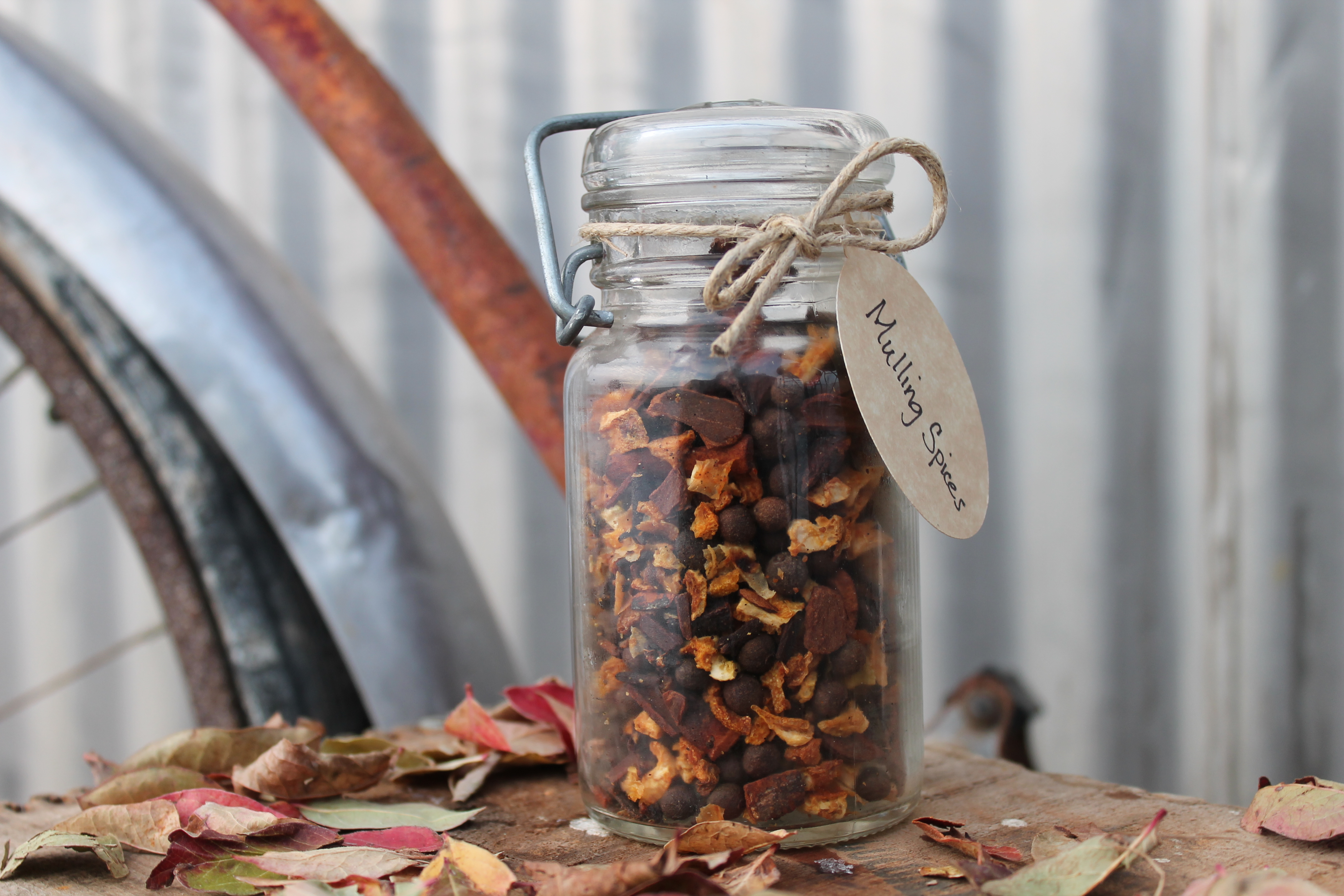
A mason jar of mulling spices

Mulling spices are a spice mixture used in drink recipes. The spices are usually added to hot apple cider, mulled wine, glögg, wassail, hippocras, and other drinks (such as juices) during autumn or winter. A "mulled" drink is a beverage that has been prepared with these spices (usually through heating in a pot with mulling spices and then straining). Mulling spices may also be added to the brewing process to make spiced beer.

The combination of spices varies, but it usually consists of cinnamon, cloves, allspice, and nutmeg, and less frequently star anise, peppercorn, or cardamom. It also usually includes dried fruit, such as raisins, apples, or orange peel. Mulling spices can be bought prepackaged.
