= Jay Kordich =

American author and advocate of juicing and juice fasting (1923–2017)

- Kordich in 1992
- Born: John Kordich; August 26, 1923; California, U.S.
- Died: May 27, 2017 (aged 93)
- Occupation: Author
- Years active: 1990s–2010s

John Kordich (August 26, 1923 – May 27, 2017) was an American author who advocated juicing and juice fasting. He also marketed a line of "Juiceman" juicers and was a frequent fixture in television infomercials beginning in the 1990s.

== Early life ==
Kordich was born near San Diego, California, and grew up in San Pedro, Los Angeles, where he was a football star at San Pedro High School. He served in the United States Navy for three years during World War II. After leaving the military, Kordich played college football for the University of Southern California in 1948 as a reserve running back. He was drafted 214th overall in the 22nd round of the 1949 NFL draft by the Green Bay Packers, but claimed that before signing a pro contract, he was diagnosed with inoperable bladder cancer. (Note: The San Pedro News-Pilot wrote in 1949 that Kordich declined to sign with the Packers due to his job as a recreation director at Daniels Field in San Pedro, which required six months of unbroken service time under civil service rules.) Kordich stated that, inspired by the Gerson diet, he was cured of cancer by consuming 13 glasses of apple and carrot juice each day.

== Career ==
Kordich authored The New York Times best seller The Juiceman's Power of Juicing, first published in 1992. He was involved in advertising a series of juicers, including the Juiceman Juicer. He lectured on the subject and appeared in television infomercials for the Juiceman Juicer. The product was sold through infomercials at the peak of the juicing craze in the summer of 1992.

The juicer was marketed by Rick Cesari's Trillium HealthProducts, which had more than $100 million in sales attributed in part to the direct marketing of the Juiceman Juicer. In 1992, Consumer Reports tested Kordich's Juiceman II extractor and concluded that other competitive models were easier to clean, cheaper, and worked better. In 2011, Kordich developed the Jay Kordich PowerGrind Pro juicer.

== Health claims ==
Kordich had no medical training or qualifications. He made health claims regarding juicing that have been disputed by medical experts. Stephen Barrett of Quackwatch noted that Kordich made far-fetched, nonsensical, and unproven health claims about juicing, including the belief that uncooked foods flush the body of toxins (detoxification), and that juicing can treat many illnesses such as anemia, anxiety, arthritis, gallstones, impotence, and heart disease. Barrett also highlighted Kordich's fundamental misunderstanding of how plant enzymes affect the human body, and his unsubstantiated demonization of cooked food.

== Personal life and death ==
Kordich promoted a raw vegan diet.

Kordich died on May 27, 2017, at the age of 93, after experiencing respiratory difficulties. His wife Linda said he suffered from no underlying illnesses.

== Selected publications ==
- The Juice Advantage (1992)
- The Juiceman's Power of Juicing (1992)
