= Aojiru =

Japanese vegetable drink

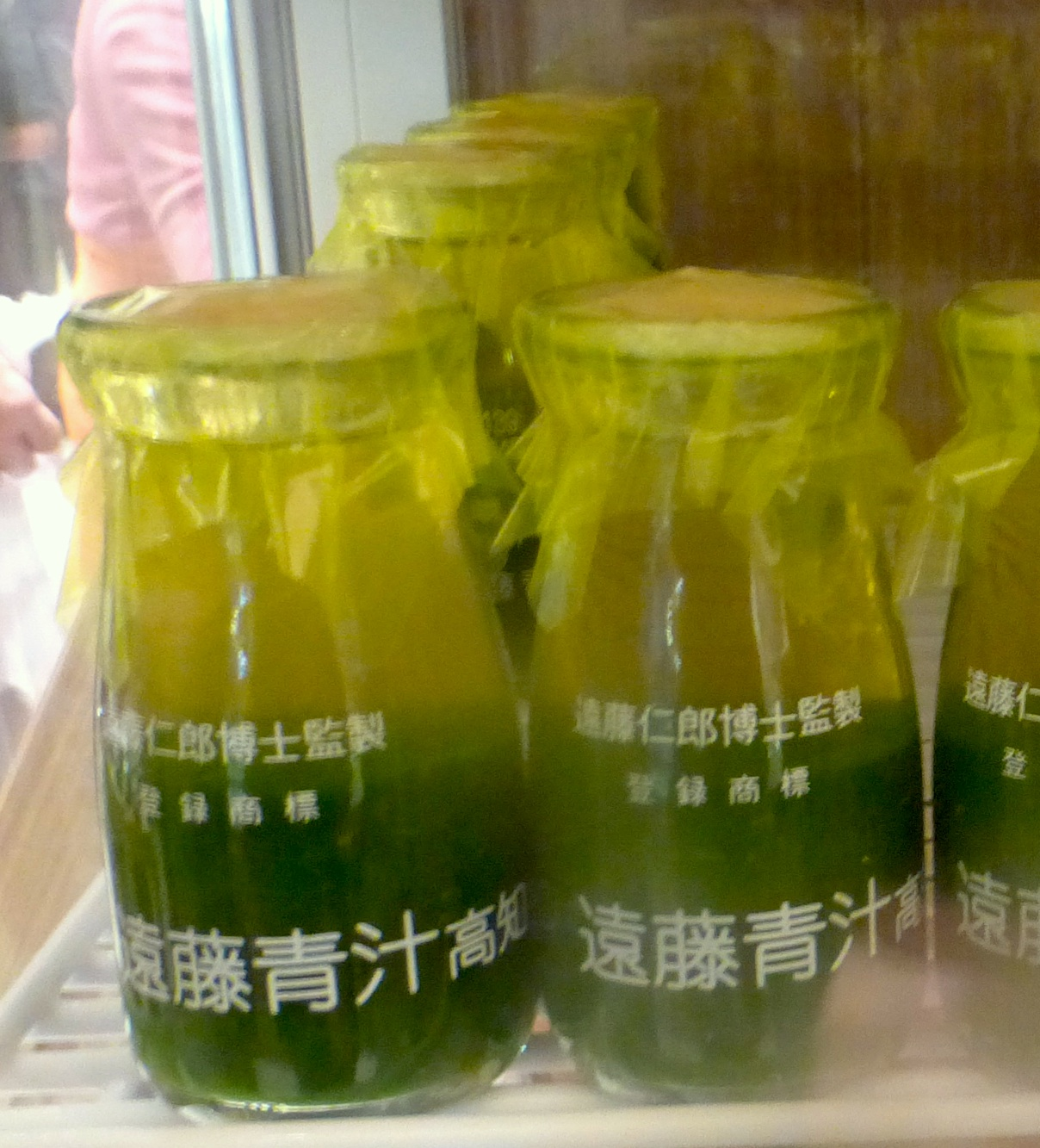
Aojiru for sale in bottles, 2015

Aojiru (Japanese: 青汁; IPA: [a̠o̞ʑiɾɯ̟]) is a Japanese vegetable drink most commonly made from kale or young barley grass. The drink is also known as green drink or green juice in English, a direct translation of the Japanese meaning.

== History ==
Aojiru was developed in October 1943 by Dr. Niro Endo (遠藤仁郎, Endō Nirō), an army doctor who experimented with juices extracted from the discarded leaves of various vegetables in an attempt to supplement his family's meager wartime diet. He credited the cure of his son from pneumonia and of his wife from nephritis to aojiru, and in 1949 concluded that kale was the best ingredient for his juice.

Aojiru was popularized in 1983 by Q'SAI (キューサイ), who started marketing 100% kale aojiru in powdered form as a dietary supplement, and sales boomed after 2000 when cosmetics giant FANCL started mass retailing of the juice. Today, many Japanese companies manufacture aojiru, usually using kale, young barley or komatsuna leaves as the base of the drink, and the size of the aojiru market was well over $500 million in 2005.

In 1990, actor and former baseball player Nobuo Yana was hired by Q'SAI as a testimonial for the drink, and his own impressions of it resulted in the commercial's famous tagline "Horrible! I'll have another one." (Mazui! Mou ippai (まずい！もう一杯)).

== Consumption ==
Aojiru is a rich source of certain vitamins and minerals, and care should therefore be taken when undergoing certain treatments or if on certain medication. The high levels of potassium, phosphorus, and vitamin A are said to worsen the health of patients on dialysis, while the high levels of vitamin K could decrease the effectiveness of medication taken for circulatory problems.

The taste of aojiru is famously unpleasant, so much so that drinking a glass of the liquid is a common punishment on Japanese TV game shows. However, new formulations of aojiru have attempted to minimize the bitter taste of the original.

== See also ==
- Health food
- Ao (color)
