= Fat, Sick and Nearly Dead =

2010 film

Fat, Sick, and Nearly Dead
- Directed by: Joe Cross; Kurt Engfehr
- Written by: Joe Cross; Robert Mac
- Produced by: Stacey Offman
- Starring: Joe Cross; Joel Fuhrman; Phil Staples
- Cinematography: Rick López; Max Polley; Jamie Rosenberg
- Edited by: Alison Amron; Christopher Seward
- Music by: M. E. Manning
- Distributed by: Gravitas Ventures
- Release dates: April 16, 2010 (Sonoma International Film Festival); April 1, 2011 (United States)
- Running time: 97 minutes
- Country: United States
- Language: English

Fat, Sick and Nearly Dead is a 2010 American documentary film which follows the 60-day journey of Australian Joe Cross across the United States as he follows a juice fast to regain his health under the care of Joel Fuhrman, Nutrition Research Foundation's Director of Research. Many health claims made regarding juice cleansing are not supported by scientific evidence.

== Summary ==
The feature-length film follows Cross, who was depressed, weighed 310 lbs, suffered from a serious autoimmune disease, and was on steroids at the start of the film, as he embarks on a juice fast. Cross and Robert Mac, co-creators of the film, both serve on the Nutrition Research Foundation's Advisory Board. Following his fast and the adoption of a plant-based diet, Cross states in a press release that he lost 100 pounds and discontinued all medications. During his road-trip Cross meets Phil Staples, a morbidly obese truck driver from Sheldon, Iowa, in a truck stop in Arizona and inspires him to try juice fasting. A sequel to the first film, Fat, Sick and Nearly Dead 2, was released in 2014.

== Awards ==
Fat, Sick, and Nearly Dead won the Turning Point Award and shared the Audience Choice Award – Documentary Film at the 2010 Sonoma International Film Festival.

== Critical reception ==
The film has received mixed reviews with review aggregation website Rotten Tomatoes giving it a rating of 69% "fresh" and Metacritic having an average score of 45 out of 100, based on 5 reviews. The Hollywood Reporter called it an "infomercial passing itself off a documentary". The New York Times stated that the film is "no great shakes as a movie, but as an ad for Mr. Cross's wellness program its now-healthy heart is in the right place". Journalist Avery Yale Kamila reviewed the film in 2011, reporting Cross planned to continue avoiding junk food and "eating a diet centered around whole food." She reported Cross had created an online community called Reboot Your Life.

== See also ==
- List of vegan and plant-based media
