= Rick Cesari =

American businessman

Rick Cesari is an American infomercial producer.

== Early life and education ==
Rick Cesari, along with his older brother Steve and six siblings, was raised in suburban Westchester County, New York, United States. After school and on weekends, he was expected to work in his father's grocery store. He studied pre-med in college.

== Career ==
Following college, Cesari moved to the western United States to join a direct mail marketing partnership. In 1989, Cesari and his brother Steve took out a home-equity loan on their mother's house to raise money to open their own business.

The new company was known as Trillium Health Products. The company ran seminars on proper nutrition and marketed a juicer, known as the Juiceman, and a smaller version known as the Juiceman, Jr. The Juiceman Juicer was marketed with direct marketing.

In 1993, Cesari and his brother sold their company to Salton Inc., and Cesari created Cesari Media (formerly known as CRTV) specializing in direct marketing. Cesari Media produces infomercials, buys the media to display them, provides web development as well as SEM and SEO and manages back-end venders that are responsible for taking orders. One of his first large deals was with Optiva (the makers of Sonicare), to market their electric toothbrushes.
