= Styre =

Apple variety

'Styre'
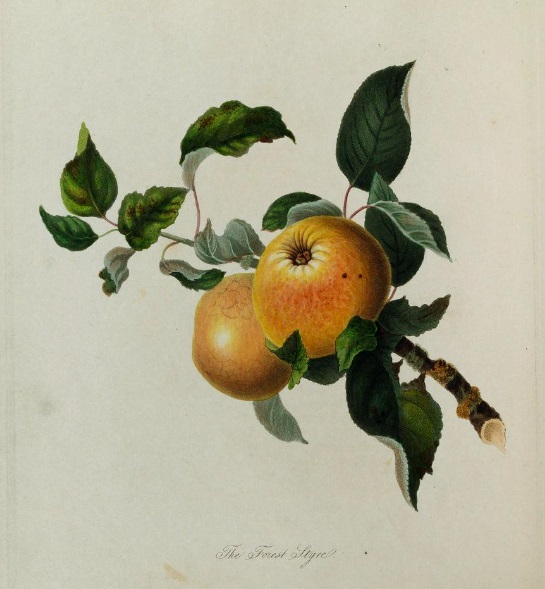
- Species: Malus domestica
- Origin: England, before 1600s.

The Styre or Stire, also known as the Forest Styre, was an old English variety of cider apple which was formerly common in the Forest of Dean. It is currently thought to be extinct, but may still survive in old orchards or gardens.

== History ==
The Styre originated in the Forest of Dean, where it grew well on the local thin limestone soils: in common with a handful of other old apple varieties, it could be simply propagated without grafting, by striking root from branches pulled from the tree's crown. Although the variety's age is unknown, it was clearly very old, its name having a possible Anglo-Saxon root. The Styre had a reputation for producing a valuable, exceptionally flavoursome and unusually strong cider. John Philips, in his 1708 poem Cyder, refers to it as "Stirom, firmest fruit", and describes it as making a long-lasting, smooth, yet deceptively strong drink.

The pioneer American pomologist and politician William Coxe, Jr. grew a number of specimens of the Styre in his orchard in Burlington, New Jersey, and commented in 1817 that the variety was even then "supposed to have passed the zenith of its perfection, and to be rapidly declining [in Herefordshire]", though his own trees attracted attention for their luxuriant growth. A number of other authors in this period commented that the Styre's productiveness and quality was in decline. It has been retrospectively suggested that this was because the Styre was a triploid apple, and in later years lacked suitable cross-pollinators, meaning that it fruited poorly. Older apple varieties may also suffer from a build-up of viruses in their tissues over time.

By the mid 19th century, the variety was already becoming uncommon, replaced by more modern cultivars. Writing in 1858, H. G. Nicholls commented, "Cider obtained from the styre apple used to be a common beverage; but that fruit has long been extinct". By 1898 another writer stated it was "almost extinct", commenting that old writers reported it yielded a "rich, full-flavoured and strong cider", commanding a high price, on the right soils. In fact, the Forest Styre seems to have survived for many years afterwards in some areas. It was last known of by staff of the Long Ashton Research Station at a farm in Aylburton in the late 1950s, and what was said to be the final recorded tree of the variety, at Halmore in the Vale of Berkeley, was not cut down until 1968.

Pomologists are currently searching for any surviving specimens of the Forest Styre.

== Characteristics ==
The Styre is, or was, characterised by small fruit with a pale yellow skin and a red blush on the fruit's sunward side; the fruit were borne on a very short stalk. It was probably a full 'bittersharp' type apple, high in tannin and acid. As well as producing good cider, the initially acidic flesh became sweet, honey-like and edible with keeping. The tree itself was very large and had a vigorous upright growth, though it tended to run to wood and did not always fruit well.
