= Roberto Cesati =

Italian footballer (born 1957)

Personal information
- Date of birth: February 5, 1957 (age 69)
- Place of birth: Milan, Italy
- Height: 1.70 m (5 ft 7 in)
- Position: Striker

Senior career*
Years	Team	Apps	(Gls)
1974–1976	Internazionale	12	(3)
1975	→ Varese (loan)	0	(0)
1976–1977	Pescara	11	(1)
1977–1978	Piacenza	32	(10)
1978–1979	Taranto	14	(0)
1979–1980	Pistoiese	27	(4)
1980–1982	Parma	42	(9)
1982–1983	Barletta	21	(1)
1983–1985	Guilianova	56	(18)
1985–1988	Centese	75	(16)
- * Club domestic league appearances and goals

Roberto Cesati (born February 5, 1957, in Milan) is a retired Italian professional football player.
