= Rick López =

Television director and executive producer

Rick López is a television director and executive producer.

== Education and early career ==
López graduated from Columbia University with an MFA in Film, and from Stanford University with a Masters in history. He served as legislative assistant to Congresswoman Nancy Pelosi, was Executive Director of the Congressional Hispanic Caucus, and was a political appointee in the Clinton administration.

== Film career ==
López is currently the Executive Producer and Showrunner for a new History Channel series.

He began his career as a director of photography before moving into directing, writing and executive producing. He was one of two directors on the Emmy nominated, History Channel mini-series, “The World Wars,” which aired in 2014. His work as cinematographer on “The Men Who Built America,” an 8-hour mini-series for the History Channel, earned him a primetime Emmy Award nomination in 2012.

He was the Director/Producer of “American Playboy,” a 10 hours mini-series about Playboy Founder, Hugh Hefner, for Amazon. In 2015, he directed and produced “The Roman Empire: Reign of Blood,” a 6-hour mini-series for Netflix.

He has also directed and produced “American Speed” for CMT, a 6-hour docu-drama about the birth of NASCAR, and “Egyptian Vice” for Spike TV, a 2-hour docu-drama about the history of Egypt’s most infamous pharaohs. Other recent work include being director of “American Genius,” an eight-episode docu-drama for National Geographic that dramatized the rivalries between America’s greatest innovators, and shooting “Gold Fever,” a four-hour, docu-drama lensed by Lopez that dramatized the discovery of gold in the 1850s American West.

Spike Lee executive produced his last feature film as DP, “The Girl is in Trouble,” and it starred Wilmer Valderrama. For his work on “I Sell the Dead,” starring Ron Perlman and Dominic Monaghan, López was awarded the Kodak Vision Award for Best Cinematographer at the Slamdance Film Festival. Variety magazine has described his work as “expert.”

He has lensed concerts for Alicia Keys, Norah Jones, Mariah Carey, Harry Connick, Jr., Florence and the Machine, the Jonas Brothers, and International Jazz Day in Istanbul, Turkey. Corporate/commercial clients include Pfizer, Pepsi, Taco Bell, Reeses, Christian Dior, Paul Mitchell, Sears, Bank of America, Philips Norelco, Sony, Kimberly-Clark, Nestle, Mastercard and Hersheys.

Before embarking on a career in TV, López worked for 7 years in the policy circles of Washington, DC. He began as a congressional aide to Representative Nancy Pelosi (D-CA), before becoming the Executive Director of the Congressional Hispanic Caucus. He was then tapped as a political appointee in the Clinton Administration to advise on education policy. He holds a BA in history and economics from the University of Michigan, an MA in American history from Stanford University and an MFA in film at Columbia University. He was later an adjunct professor at Columbia.

He is represented by Creative Artists Agency.
