= Vegetable juice =

Drink made from vegetables

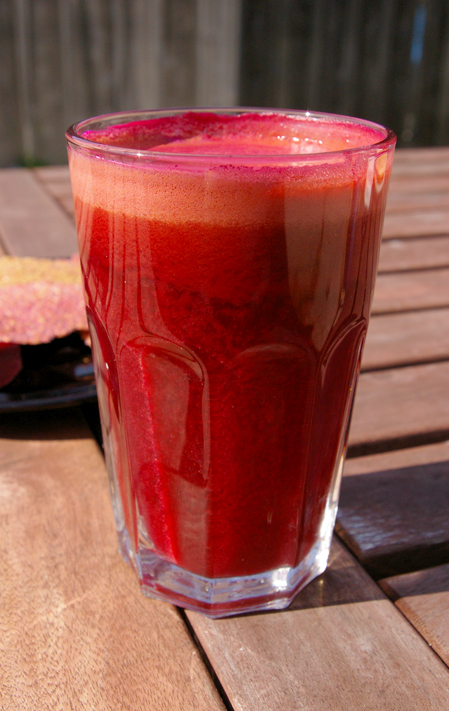
A glass of beet juice

Vegetable juice is a juice drink made primarily of blended vegetables and also available in the form of powders. Vegetable juice is often mixed with fruits such as apples or grapes to improve flavor. It is often touted as a low-sugar alternative to fruit juice, although some commercial brands of vegetable juices use fruit juices as sweeteners, and may contain large amounts of sodium.

== Home-made juice ==
Making vegetable juice at home is an alternative to buying commercial juices, and may augment diets low in vegetables and fruits. The juicer separates juice from pulp fibers. Masticating juicers employ a slow-geared grinding mechanism. A cheaper and faster alternative uses centrifugal force to achieve separation. The slower speed of the masticating process is held to protect the vegetables from oxidation and heat (from friction), reducing nutrient breakdown. Advocates of masticating juicers often cite the preservation of enzymes, though these are rarely specified and the claims are unsubstantiated by a body of academic support. Juicing the fine leaves of wheatgrass usually requires a masticating process.

== Varieties ==
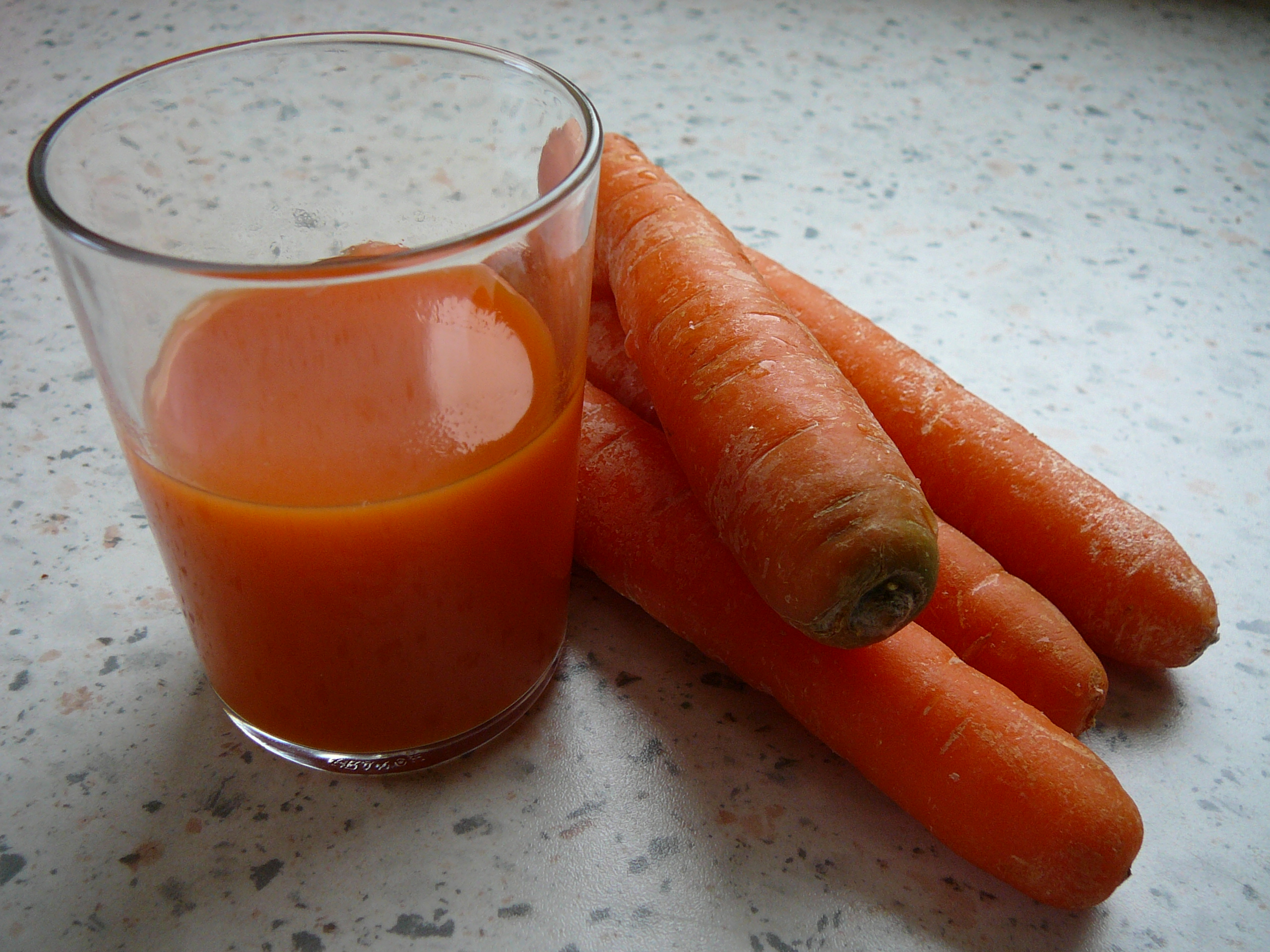
Carrot juice and carrots

Commercial vegetable juices are commonly made from varying combinations of carrots, beets, pumpkin, and tomatoes. The latter two, although not technically vegetables, are commonly used to increase palatability. Other popular items in vegetable juices are parsley, dandelion greens, kale, celery, fennel, and cucumbers. Lemon, garlic and ginger may be added by some for medicinal purposes.

Other common juices include carrot juice, tomato juice, and turnip juice.

In Asian cultures, primarily Chinese, Chinese yam (Chinese: shān yào, Japanese: nagaimo) is also used for vegetable juices. They are used quite sparingly, however, for many Chinese consider it to be a medicine rather than a vegetable.

Kale juice marketed as Aojiru in Japan has become well known for its purported health benefits and bitter taste.

Japan also markets several kinds of vegetable juices which, unlike Western juices, usually depend on carrots and fruits instead of large amounts of tomato juice for their flavor.

== Nutrition ==
In general, vegetable juices are recommended as supplements to whole vegetables, rather than as a replacement. However, the actual nutritional value of juices versus whole vegetables is still contested.

USDA guidelines for Americans states that 3/4 cup of 100% vegetable juice is equivalent to one serving of vegetables. This is upheld by a 2006 study, which found that juices provide similar health benefits as whole vegetables in terms of reducing risks of cardiovascular disease and cancer although the authors noted "a lack of human data and contradictory findings hampered conclusions". Another study has found that drinking vegetable juice reduces risks of Alzheimer's disease by 76%.

However, the British Nutrition Foundation holds that although vegetable juice counts as a serving, it can only count as one serving, regardless of the amount of juice drunk. Additionally, A 2007 Japanese study showed that although Japanese commercial juices had nutritional benefits, they were insufficient as a primary mode of vegetable consumption.

Many popular vegetable juices, particularly ones with high tomato content, are high in sodium, and therefore consumption of them for health must be carefully considered. Some vegetables such as beets also contain large amounts of sugar, so care must be taken when adding these to juices.

Consumption of certain vegetable juices can also contribute substantially to oxalate intake; people who form calcium oxalate stones may be advised to limit consumption of vegetable juices. Cases of oxalate nephropathy associated with oxalate-rich juice intake have also been documented in susceptible individuals.

Although the actual nutritional benefits of vegetable juice are contested, a 2008 UC Davis study found that drinking vegetable juice daily significantly increased drinkers' chances of meeting the daily recommended number of vegetable servings. Having an easy source of vegetables encouraged drinkers to incorporate more vegetables into their diets. Children who refuse whole vegetables may find vegetable juice, when blended with fruit juice, a palatable alternative.

== See also ==
- Juicing
- List of juices
- Raw veganism
