= Juicing =

Process of extracting juice from fruit or vegetables

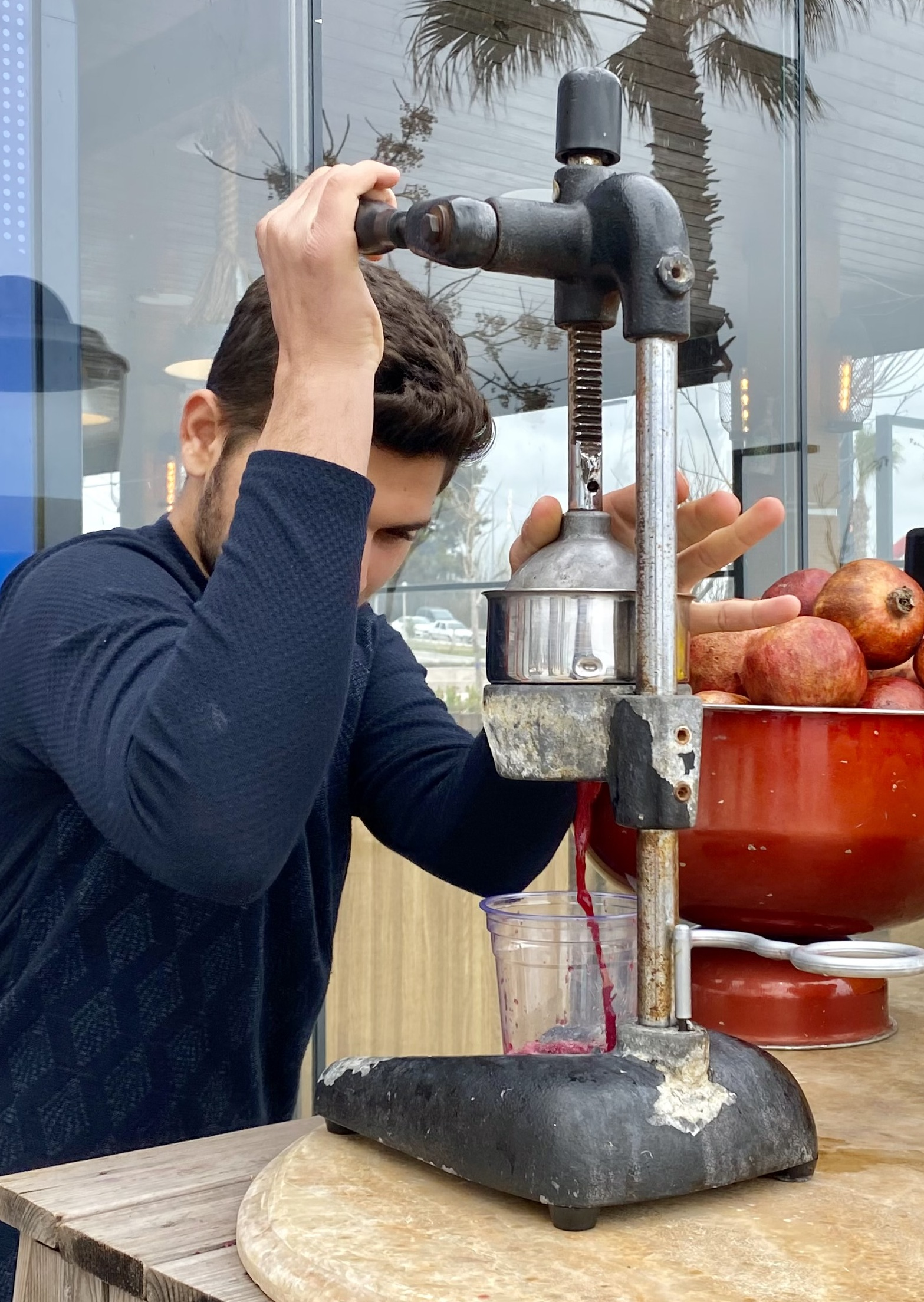
A hand press juicer being used to extract pomegranate juice

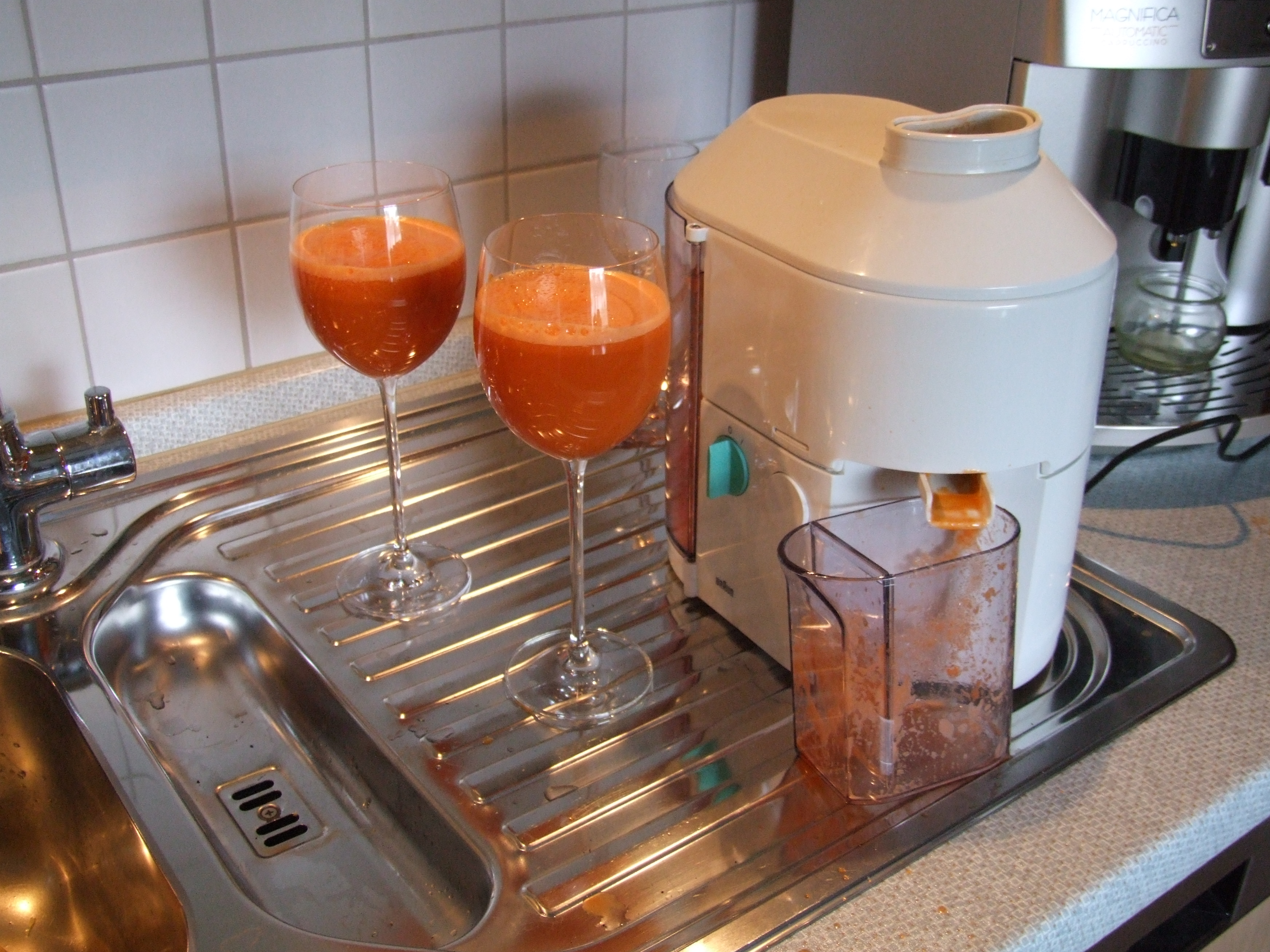
Carrot juice extracted using an electric centrifugal juicer

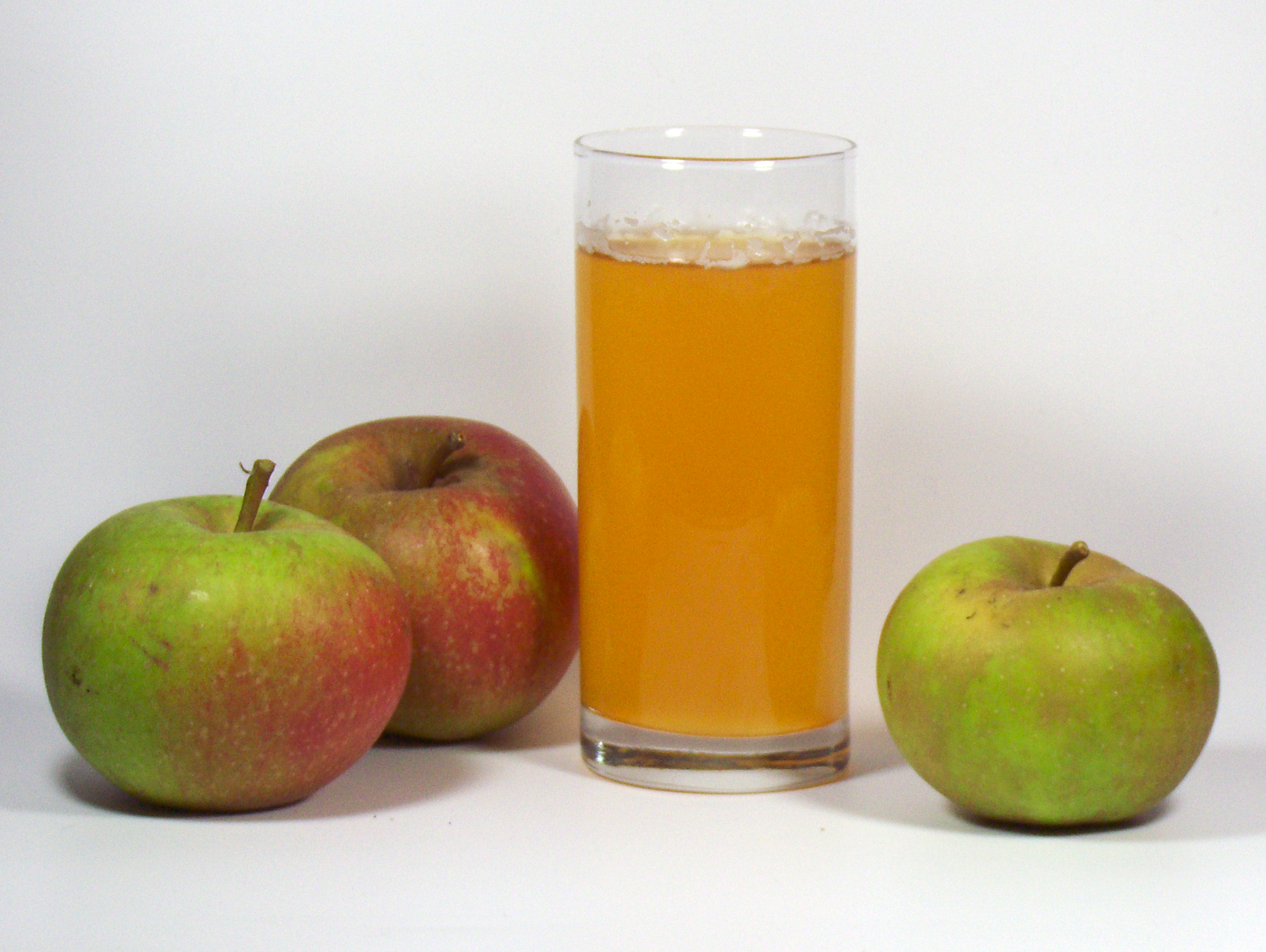
A glass of apple juice

Juicing is the process of extracting juice from plant tissues such as fruit or vegetables.

== Overview ==
There are many methods of juicing, from squeezing fruit by hand to wide-scale extraction with industrial equipment. Juicing is generally the preferred method of consuming large amounts of produce quickly and is often completed with a household appliance called a juicer, which may be as simple as a cone upon which fruit is mashed or as sophisticated as a variable-speed, motor-driven device. It may also refer to the act of extracting and then drinking juice or those who extract the juice.

Juicing is different from buying juice in the supermarket because it focuses on fresh pressed fruits and vegetables. Residential juicing is often practiced for dietary reasons or as a form of alternative medicine. Becoming first popular in the early 1970s, interest in juicing has since increased. The 2011 Australian documentary Fat, Sick and Nearly Dead increased global sales of juicers.

In America, juicing was popularized by Gayelord Hauser, Jay Kordich and Norman W. Walker.

== Methods ==
Juicing tools have been used throughout history. Manual devices include barrel-shaped presses, hand-operated grinders, and inverted cones upon which fruit is mashed and twisted. Modern juicers are powered by electric motors generating from 200 to 1000 or more watts. There are several types of electric juicers: masticating, centrifugal, and triturating juicers. These variations are defined by the means of extracting the juice.

- Masticating (also referred to as cold pressed) – utilizes a single gear driven by a motor; slower operation; kneads and grinds items placed in a chute
- Centrifugal – (also referred to as high-speed juicing) – utilizes a spinning blade that resembles a grated basket; faster operation; quickly grinds items and discards pulp in a receptacle
- Triturating – utilizes twin gears; slower operation; often has multiple uses

== Health effects ==
The American Journal of Public Health proposed that the Healthy Hunger-Free Kids Act of 2010 in the United States eliminate 100% fruit juices since it has been linked to childhood obesity, and substitute instead with whole fruits.

Juicing removes the fiber content of the fruit or vegetable, and the full benefits of the plant is thus not experienced. Re-adding fiber to the juice cannot be equated to whole fruits. There is a loss in non-extracted polyphenols, a class of phytonutrients, in fruit juice compared to whole plant foods. Most polyphenols are bound to the plant fibers, and constitute the major portion of dietary polyphenols. There is therefore a marked loss of phytonutrients in consuming fruits and vegetables through the juicing process alone.

The American Cancer Society says, "there is no convincing scientific evidence that extracted juices are healthier than whole foods".

Juicing may not be the best way to extract all of the nutritional value from fruits and vegetables. One study has shown that when juiced grapefruit was compared with blended, the latter was superior. Smoothies, which are the blending of fruit into juice, not the extraction, leave pulp and seeds within the drink leading to better nutrition.

== See also ==
- Health food
- Healthy diet
- Jack LaLanne
- List of ineffective cancer treatments
- Juice fasting
- Juicer
- Max Gerson
- Norman Walker
- Smoothie
