= Juicer =

Tool for extracting fruit and vegetable juices

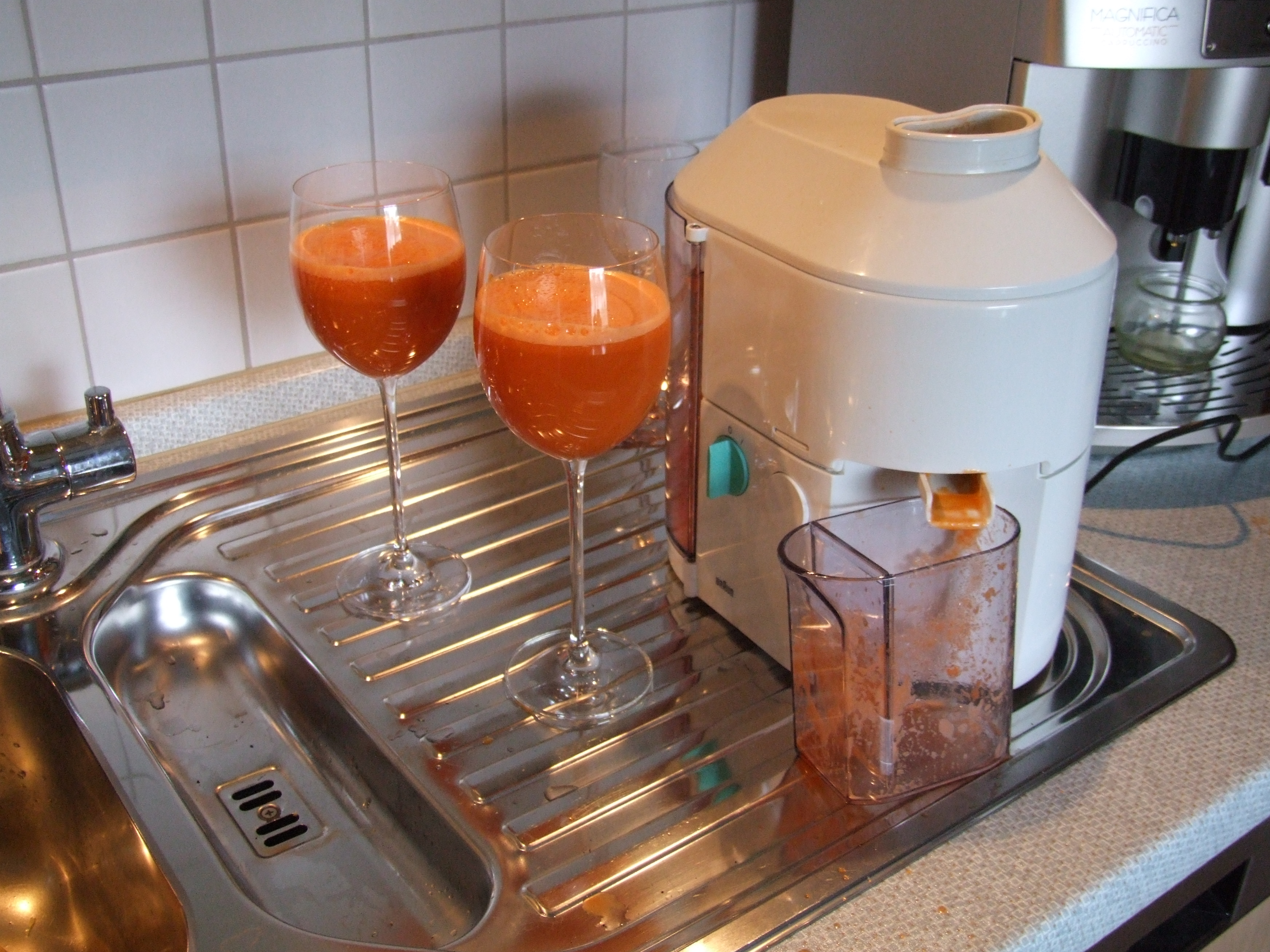
Electric centrifugal juicer

A juicer, also known as a juice extractor, is a tool used to extract juice from fruits, herbs, leafy greens and other types of vegetables in a process called juicing. It crushes, grinds, and/or squeezes the juice out of the pulp. A juicer clarifies the juice through a screening mesh to remove the pulp unlike a blender where the output contains both the liquids and solids of the processed fruit(s) or vegetable(s).

Some types of juicers can also function as a food processor. Most of the twin gear and horizontal masticating juicers have attachments for crushing herbs and spices, extruding pasta, noodles or bread sticks, making baby food and nut butter, grinding coffee, making nut milk, etc.

== Types ==
=== Reamers ===
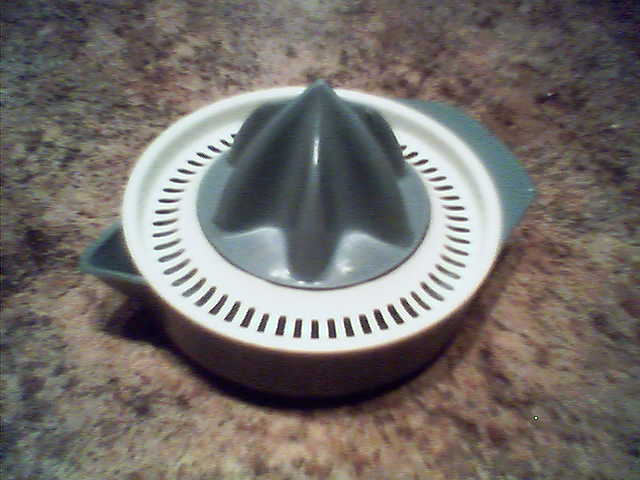
A manual-styled squeezer is used to separate citrus' juice from its pulp.

Squeezers are used for squeezing juice from citrus such as grapefruits, lemons, limes, and oranges. Juice is extracted by pressing or grinding a halved citrus along a juicer's ridged conical center and discarding the rind. Some reamers are stationary and require a user to press and turn the fruit, while others are electrical, automatically turning the ridged center when fruit is pressed upon.

=== Centrifugal juicers ===
A centrifugal juicer cuts up the fruit or vegetable with a flat cutting blade. It then spins the produce at a high speed to separate the juice from the pulp. In most models, the pulp gets collected to a different part of the machine

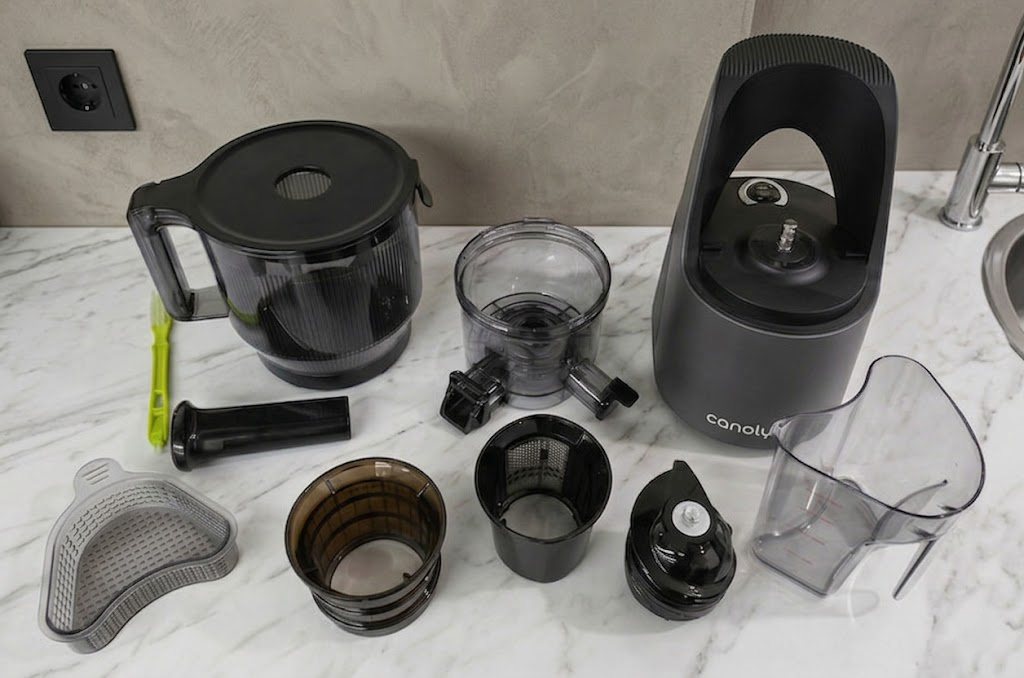
Masticating juicer parts, including base, hopper, chamber, strainer.

=== Masticating juicers ===
A masticating juicer known as cold press juicer or slow juicer uses a single auger to compact and crush produce into smaller sections before squeezing out its juice along a static screen while the pulp is expelled through a separate outlet. Instead of relying on fast-spinning blades, cold press systems use slow, controlled force to crush and press ingredients.

=== Triturating juicers ===
Triturating juicers (twin gear juicers) have twin augers to crush and press produce.

=== Juicing press ===
A juicing press, such as a fruit press or wine press, is a larger scale press that is used in agricultural production. These presses can be stationary or mobile. A mobile press has the advantage that it can be moved from one orchard to another. The process is primarily used for apples and involves a stack of apple mash, wrapped in fine mesh cloth, which is then pressed under approx 40 tonnes. These machines are popular in Europe and have now been introduced to North America.

=== Steam juice extractor ===
A stovetop steam juice extractor is typically a pot to generate steam that is used to heat a batch of berries (or other fruit) in a perforated pot stacked on top of a juice collecting container that is above the steam pot. The juice is extracted without mechanical means so it is remarkably clear and because of the steam heating it is also pasteurized for long term storage.

== See also ==
- Smoothie
- Vegetable juice
- Juicero
