= Abuelita =

Mexican brand of chocolate by Nestlé

- Product type: Chocolate
- Current owner: Nestlé
- Country: Mexico
- Introduced: 1939; 87 years ago
- Markets: Mexico
- Previous owners: La Azteca
- Website: goodnes.com/abuelita

Abuelita is a Mexican hot chocolate also known as chocolate para mesa (English: "table chocolate") owned by the Nestlé company. It was originally invented and commercialized in Mexico in 1939, by Fábrica de Chocolates La Azteca. The name is an affectionate Spanish word for "grandma" (literally translated as "little grandmother" or "granny"). Since 1973, Mexican actress Sara García has been featured in the logo image of the brand. The brand was acquired by Nestle in 1995.

Abuelita is now produced and sold in chocolate tablets, syrup, or individual packets of powdered mix.

== Overview ==
The Abuelita product ingredients (in order of percentage): sugar, chocolate processed with alkali, soy lecithin, vegetable oils (palm, shea nut and/or illipe nut), artificial cinnamon flavor, PGPR (an emulsifier). The Abuelita Hot Chocolate has been a Mexican staple product since 1939 and can be identified by its unique taste and packaging.

One suggested method for preparing Abuelita is to bring a saucepan of milk (not water) to a boil, then add the tablet of chocolate and stir continuously with a whisk or molinillo (a whisk-like wooden stirring spoon native to Meso America). This action is done until it has reached a melted and bubbly or creamy consistency. The drink is served hot or chilled to mix with alcoholic beverages.

Abuelita is often prepared for special occasions, such as Day of the Dead (a holiday in which people remember their family and friends whose spirits departed to the afterlife) and Las Posadas (Christmas season).

== See also ==
- Champurrado, Mexican hot chocolate
- List of chocolate drinks
- Ibarra (chocolate)
