= Chocolate tea =

Chocolate tea may refer to:

- Any variety of tea with chocolate in it
- The name in Nigeria used for hot cocoa
