= Lumumba (disambiguation) =

Patrice Lumumba (1925–1961) was the first Prime Minister of the Congo.

Lumumba may also refer to:

- Lumumba (band), an Argentinian reggae band
- Lumumba (drink), a drink made with cocoa, rum and cream
- Lumumba (film), a biographical film directed by Raoul Peck
- "Lumumba", a 1968 tribute song by Bongi Makeba from Keep Me in Mind

== People with the surname ==
- Chokwe Lumumba (1947–2014), mayor of Jackson, Mississippi
- Chokwe Antar Lumumba (born 1983), mayor of Jackson, Mississippi
- François Lumumba (born 1951), Congolese politician, member of Mouvement National Congolais
- Guy-Patrice Lumumba, Congolese politician
- Héritier Lumumba (born 1986), Australian rules footballer
- Patrick Loch Otieno Lumumba (born 1962), Kenyan lawyer

== People with the given name ==
- Lumumba Di-Aping, Sudanese diplomat

== See also ==
- Congolese National Movement-Lumumba, a political party founded by Patrice Lumumba
- Peoples' Friendship University of Russia, formerly known as Patrice Lumumba University
