= Champurrado =

Mexican chocolate beverage

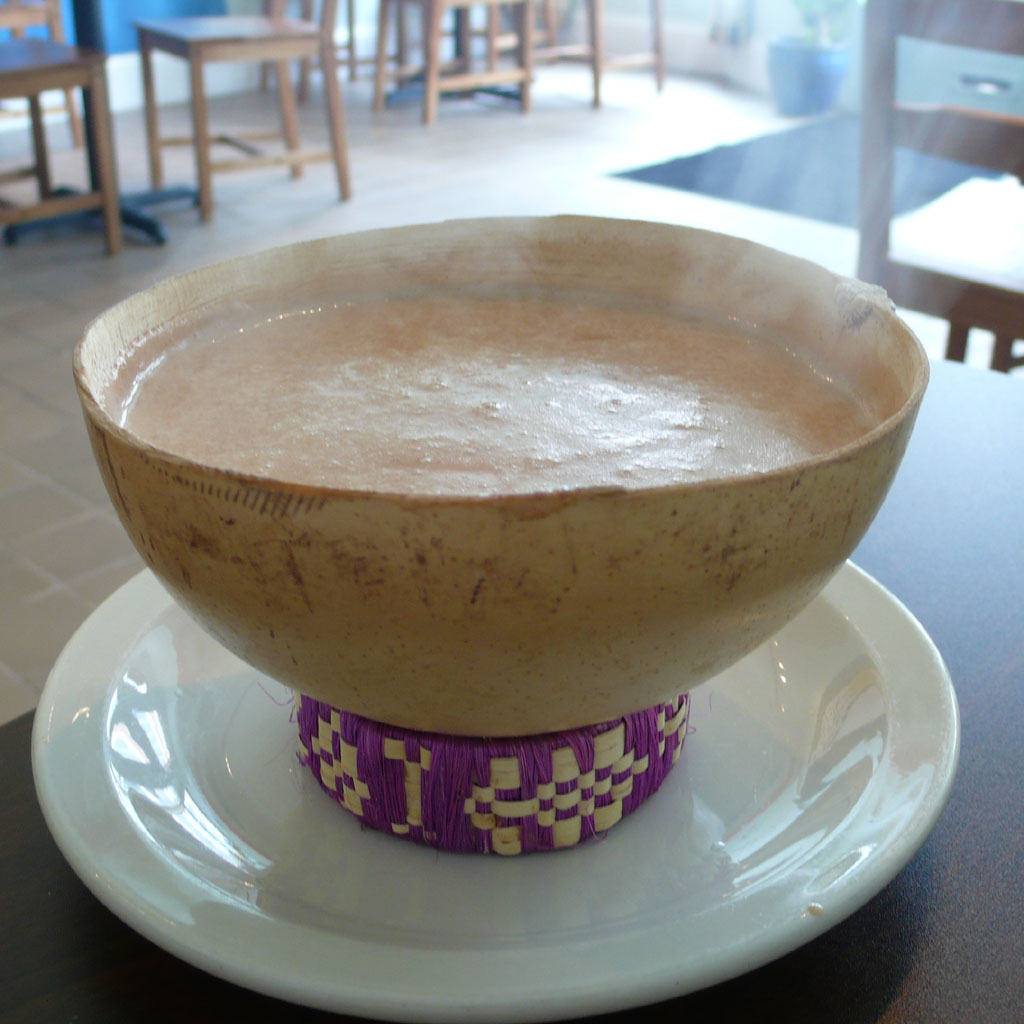
- Hot bowl of champurrado as served at a Mexican breakfast
- Type: Beverage
- Place of origin: Mexico
- Region or state: Mesoamerica
- Serving temperature: Hot
- Main ingredients: masa de maíz or masa harina, chocolate, piloncillo cinnamon and aniseed or vanilla
- Ingredients generally used: Ground nuts, orange zest, and egg
- Food energy (per serving): 304 kcal (1,270 kJ)
Nutritional value
(per serving)
- Protein: 6 g
- Fat: 8 g
- Carbohydrate: 56 g
- Similar dishes: Champorado

Champurrado is a chocolate-based atole, a warm and thick Mexican beverage. It is prepared with either a masa (lime-treated corn dough), masa harina (a dried version of this dough), or corn flour (simply very finely ground dried corn, especially local varieties grown for atole); piloncillo; water or milk; chocolate; and occasionally cinnamon, aniseed, or vanilla. Ground nuts, orange zest, and egg can also be added to thicken and enrich the drink. Atole drinks are whipped up using a wooden whisk called a molinillo. The whisk is rolled between the palms of the hands, then moved back and forth in the mixture, until it is aerated and frothy; a blender may also be used.

Champurrado is traditionally served with a churro in the morning as a simple breakfast or as a late afternoon snack. Champurrado is also very popular during Day of the Dead and at Las Posadas (during the Christmas season), where it is served alongside tamales. Champurrado may also be made with alcohol.

== History ==
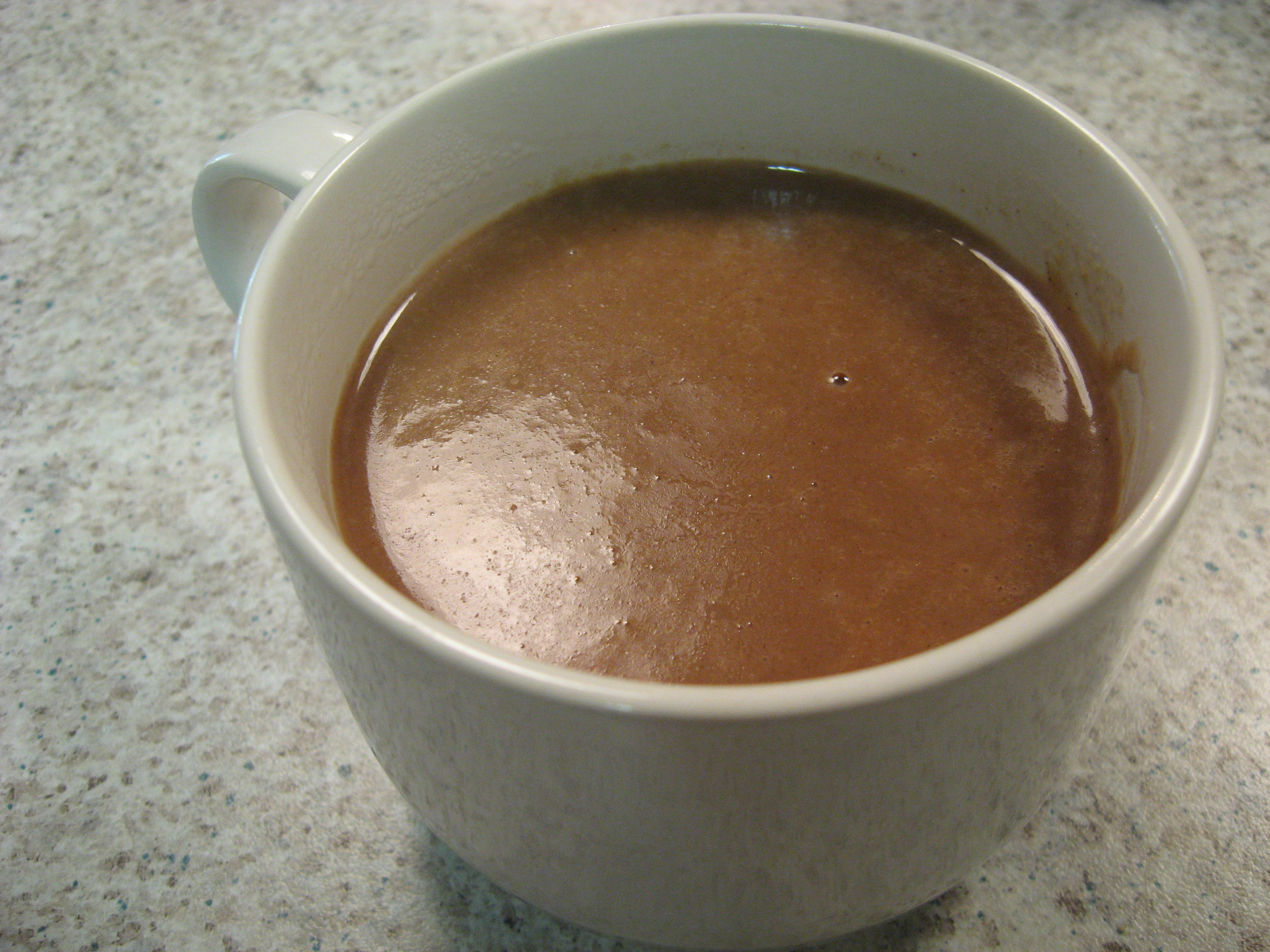
Champurrado, a Mexican chocolate-based drink

Chocolate is native to Mesoamerica, and it was first cultivated by the Mayans and the Mexicas. The Mayans used the cacao beans in various ceremonies such as marriage and trade. Natives drank chocolate with corn puree, or masa. These drinks were thought of as magical and upon drinking, would give the drinker power and strength.

Since sugarcane (originally from Southeast Asia) came to the Americas sometime after Europeans did, chocolate was said to have an acquired taste as it comes off as bitter without added sweetener. Spaniards created a drink consisting of chocolate, vanilla, and other spices which was served chilled. This drink cannot be compared to modern-day hot chocolate as it was very spicy and bitter, contrasting with the modern notion of very sweet, warm chocolate.

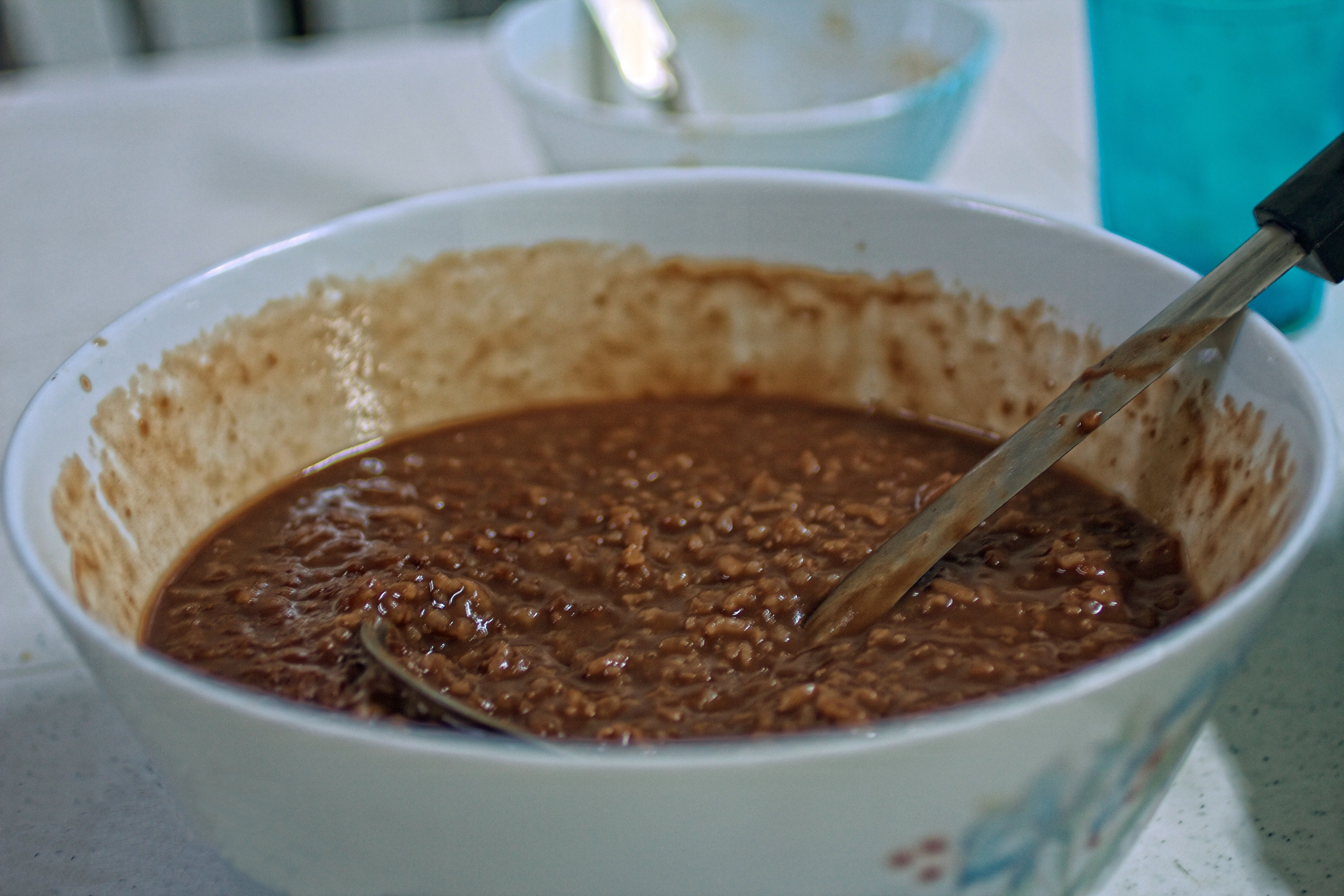
Champorado, Filipino chocolate rice porridge

The invention of champurrado shows the adaptation of ancient practices by European colonialists. Upon the production of the drink, special tools like the molinillo were made to assist in the making of the drink which is now also used to make traditional hot chocolate in former Spanish colonies.

There are many versions of champurrado in different countries. A unique variant in the Philippines is champorado. Although adapted directly from Mexican champurrado via the Manila galleons, it differs in that it uses whole grains of glutinous rice instead of masa. Instead of a drink, it is a sweet rice porridge traditionally eaten during cold rainy days and in the Christmas season.

Many Latin Americans, especially Mexicans, enjoy champurrado around the holidays when the weather is colder. It differs significantly from hot chocolate in its taste and texture. The taste of the beverage also varies based on how it was made.

== Terminology ==
Champurrado is a type of atole (corn masa drink) with its main characteristic consisting of chocolate. The difference between traditional hot chocolate and champurrado is the use of masa harina (corn flour). Atole is made by toasting masa on a griddle, then adding water that has been boiled with cinnamon sticks. The resulting blends vary in texture, ranging from a porridge to a very thin, liquid consistency. In northern Mexico, a variation is also made using pinole (sweetened toasted corn meal). Although atole is one of the traditional drinks of the Mexican holidays Day of the Dead and Las Posadas, it is very common during breakfast and dinner time at any time of year. In the state Chiapas, it is common for the indigenous Tzotzil people to sell atole. It is usually sold as street food but can be found in various Latin restaurants. The inclusion of chocolate to the atole gives birth to champurrado.

There are many different types of recipes to make champurrado. Different states in Mexico for example, use spices to enhance its taste. Cooking champurrado in a clay pot is also traditional and brings out the flavor even further.

== See also ==
- Abuelita
- Champorado
- Tejate
- Ibarra (chocolate)
- List of chocolate drinks
- List of hot drinks
- List of maize dishes
