= Ibarra (chocolate) =

Mexican brand of chocolate

Ibarra table chocolate

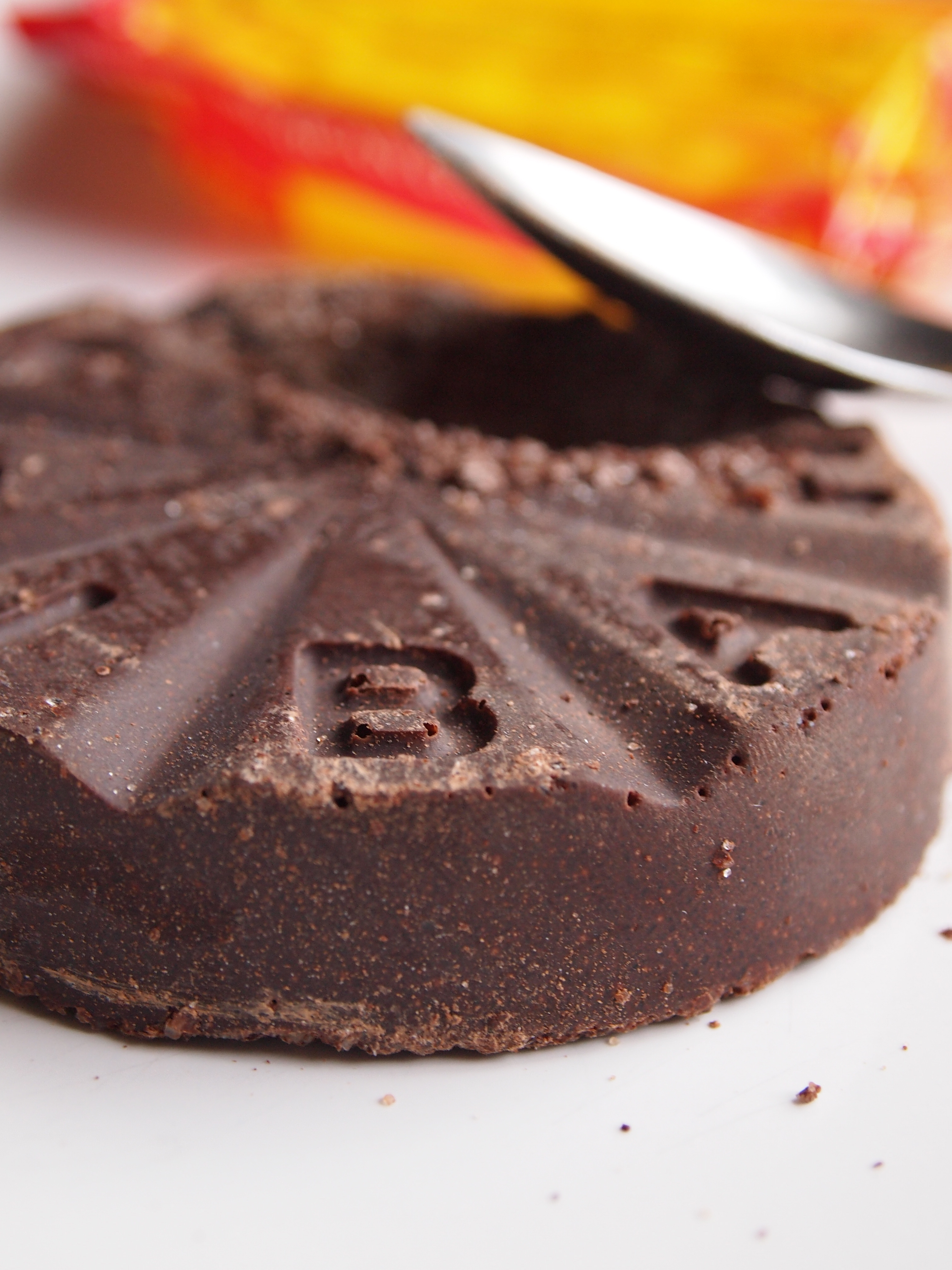
Ibarra table chocolate

Ibarra is a brand of Mexican chocolate para mesa (English: "table chocolate"), produced since 1925, and since 1954 produced by the company Chocolatera de Jalisco of Guadalajara, Jalisco, Mexico. The company manufactures other chocolate products, but Ibarra table chocolate is its best-known product, with presence throughout Mexico as well as international markets, mainly in the Americas, but also in parts of Europe.

Ibarra tablets are packaged in a distinctive red-and-yellow hexagon-shaped cardboard box. Each circular tablet of table chocolate is about 1/2 in (13 mm) in thick and 3 1/4 in (83 mm) in diameter, and is molded into 8 wedges. The letters of the name "IBARRA" are also molded into the chocolate. The ingredients are cocoa paste, sugar, cinnamon, and soy lecithin. A premium grade version does not contain vegetable fat, which is often used in chocolate based foods as a less expensive substitute, with the only fat being the cocoa butter in the cocoa liquor.

Unlike chocolate bars, and because of its undissolved granulated sugar, and its rough and gritty texture, tablet chocolate is not meant to be eaten like a chocolate bar, although Ibarra tablets can be eaten. However, Ibarra is used primarily to make hot cocoa in traditional Mexican form. The labeling on Ibarra's packaging suggests that the best way to prepare Ibarra is to use approximately two wedges for each cup of milk or water. Heat the milk until it is near boiling, then blend the milk and chocolate in a blender until the chocolate is completely dissolved, and serve hot. Ibarra can also be prepared on the stove by dissolving the wedges in hot milk, then whisking the cocoa with a molinillo or wire whisk. In Mexico, in the traditional Aztec and Mayan form, Cayenne pepper is added to make it a spicy chocolate drink.

It is also used in some mole sauces, in particular, mole poblano.

== See also ==
- List of chocolate drinks
- Abuelita
