= Broadband acoustic resonance dissolution spectroscopy =

Analytical chemistry technique

Broadband acoustic resonance dissolution spectroscopy (BARDS) is a technique in analytical chemistry. Developed in the late 2000s, it involves the analysis of the changes in sound frequency generated when a solute dissolves in a solvent, by harnessing the hot chocolate effect.

The technique is partly based on the solubility difference of gas in pure solvents and in solutions. The dissolution of a compound in a pure solvent results in the generation of gas bubbles in the solvent, due to the lowering of gas solubility in the resulting solution, as well as the introduction of gases with the solute. The presence of these gas bubbles increases the compressibility of the solution, thereby lowering the velocity of sound in the solution. This effect can be monitored by means of the frequency change of acoustic resonances that are mechanically produced in the solvent.

== Principles of the BARDS response ==
Water is approximately 800 times more dense than air. However, air is approximately 15,000 times more compressible than water. The velocity of sound, υ, in a homogeneous liquid or gas is given by the following equation:

$$\upsilon = \frac{1}{\sqrt{K\rho}}$$

where ρ is the mass density and K the compressibility of the gas or liquid. K is given as:

$$K = \frac{\left ({dV \over dp} \right )}{V}$$

where V is the volume of the medium, and dV is the volume decrease due to the pressure increase dp of the sound wave. When water is filled with air bubbles, the fluid density is essentially the density of water, and the air will contribute significantly to the compressibility. Crawford derived the relationship between fractional bubble volume and sound velocity in water, and hence the sound frequency in water, given as.

$${\upsilon_w \over \upsilon} = {f_w \over f}  = {(1+\alpha V_a)}^{1 \over 2}$$

where υ_{w} and υ are the velocities of sound in pure and bubble-filled water, respectively, f_{w} and f are the frequencies of sound in pure and bubble-filled water, respectively, V_{a} is defined as the fractional volume occupied by gas bubbles, and α is a constant. When the solvent is water and the gas is air, the value of α is 1.49 × 10^{4}.

The effect of changes in solution density and solution compressibility are additive and reinforce the phenomenon, causing a significant decrease in the velocity of sound and, therefore, a significant decrease in the frequency of sound passing through an aerated solution.

== Applications ==
BARDS has significant potential as an analytical technique. Applications researched so far include:

- Batch consistency analysis
- Blend uniformity analysis
- Polymorph and pseudopolymorph discrimination
- Monitoring of supersaturation of solutions and rates of outgassing

== See also ==
- The hot chocolate effect, the physical phenomenon on which the technique is based.
- Acoustic resonance spectroscopy
