= Antonio de León Pinelo =

Spanish historian (1589–1660)

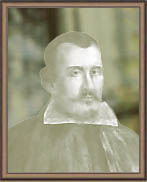
- Died: 1660

Antonio de León Pinelo (1589–1660) was a historian from the Viceroyalty of Peru.

Pinelo was born in Cordova de Tucuman to a converso family, and educated in the College of the Jesuits of Lima. He travelled to Spain in 1612 and became attorney of the council of the Indies. Then, he became judge of the tribunal of La Contratacion in Seville, succeeding Gil Gonzalez Davila in 1658 in the post of historian of the Indies. He died in Seville.

Antonio de Leon Pinelo maintained at great length that Biblical Paradise was situated in America. He lived much of his early years in South America, particularly Lima, Peru.

The "cedularios" permitted initiating the compiling works, because they provided order to legal texts. Using those as a base, several Spanish jurists started writing the so-called "summaries", which were extracts of a new law or a mixture of several laws about the same theme. In this work, one of the first was Diego de Zorrilla, whose work was then revised by Rodrigo de Aguiar and lastly by Antonio de Leon Pinelo, who prepared a new project and in 1628 published the summaries of the 4 first books so they could be revised.

== Works ==
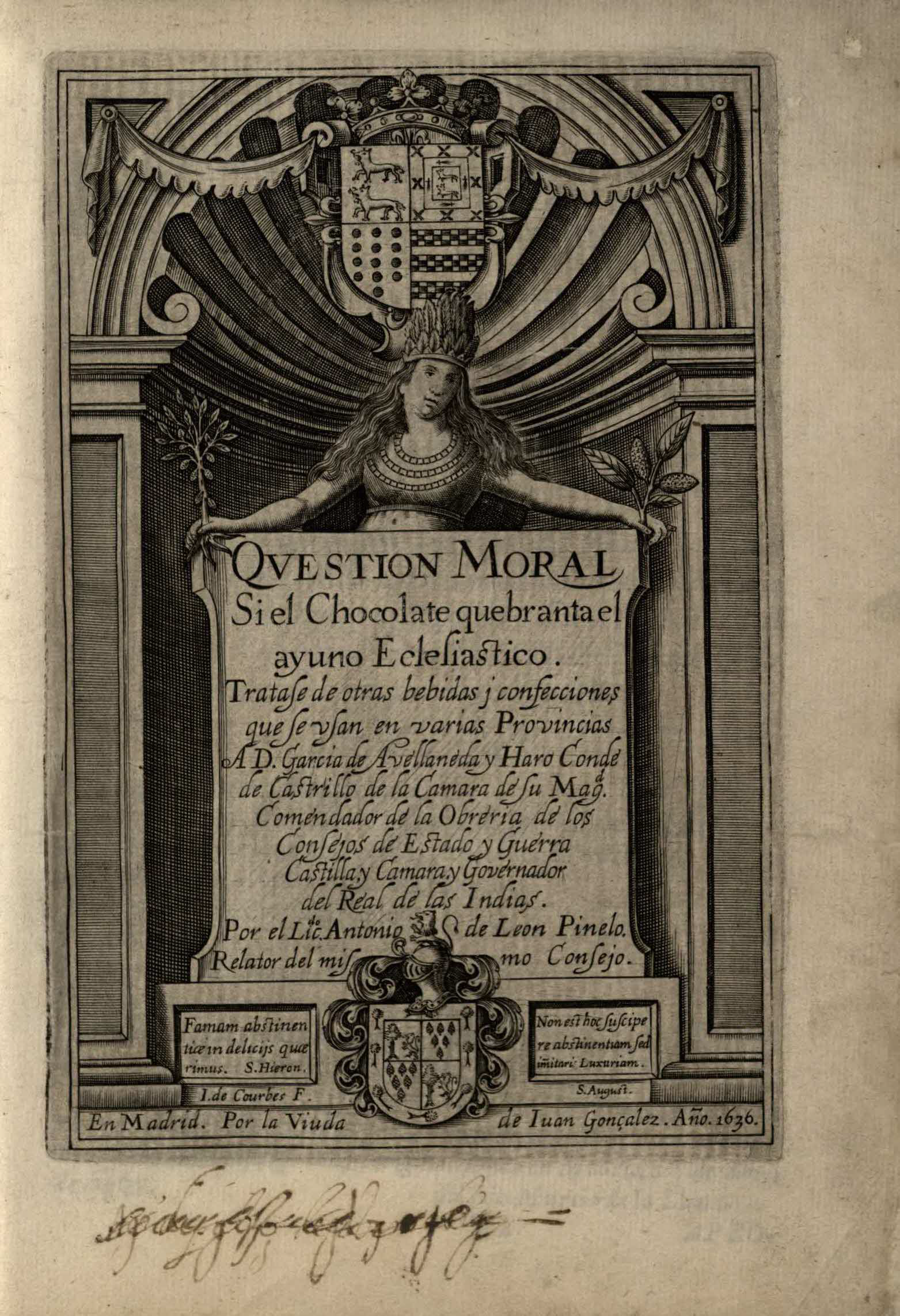
Cuestión moral: si el chocolate quebranta el ayuno eclesiástico (Whether chocolate breaks ecclesiastical fast: a moral question)

- Around 1615 he began collecting all the decrees and ordinances that had been issued either by the home government or by the viceroys of the American possessions. He published his works in 1623 "Discurso de la importancia, de la forma, y de la disposicion de la colleccion de las leyes de Indias" (Seville, 1623).
- After obtaining the king's approval to search the archives of Madrid and Simancas, he published an abridged first part, "Sumario de la recopilacion general" (Seville, 1634). He completed the work in 1645, but its publication was deferred until 1680, when Vicente Gonzaga published it under the title " Recopilacion general de las leyes de las Indias " (4 vols., Madrid, 1680).
- Epitome de la Biblioteca oriental y occidental, nautica y geografica (Madrid, 1629)
- Tratado de confirmaciones reales, que se requieren para las Indias Occidentales (1630)
- Cuestion moral si el chocolate quebronta el ayuno ecclesiastica (1636)
- Velos antiguos i modernos en los rostros de las mugeres sus convenencias i daños [Veils ancient and modern on the faces of women: their conveniences and harms.] (1641)
- Tablas Cronologicas (1645)
- Aparato politico de las Indias Occidentales (1653)
- Vida de Santo Toribio arzobispo de Lima (1653)
- El Paraiso en el Nuevo Mundo (1656)
- Acuerdos del Concejo de Indias (1658)

Pinelo left also several manuscripts, some of which have been published since his death:

- Politica de las Indias (1829).
- Bulario Indico. Code of the canonical laws in force in South America (1829).
- Historia del Supremo Concejo de las Indias.
- Las ha-zafias de Chile con su historia.
- Fundacion v historia de la ciudad de Lima.
- Descubrimiento y historia de Potosi.
- Relacion de la provincia de Minche y Lacaudon.
