= Hot chocolate =

Warm chocolate beverage in milk or water

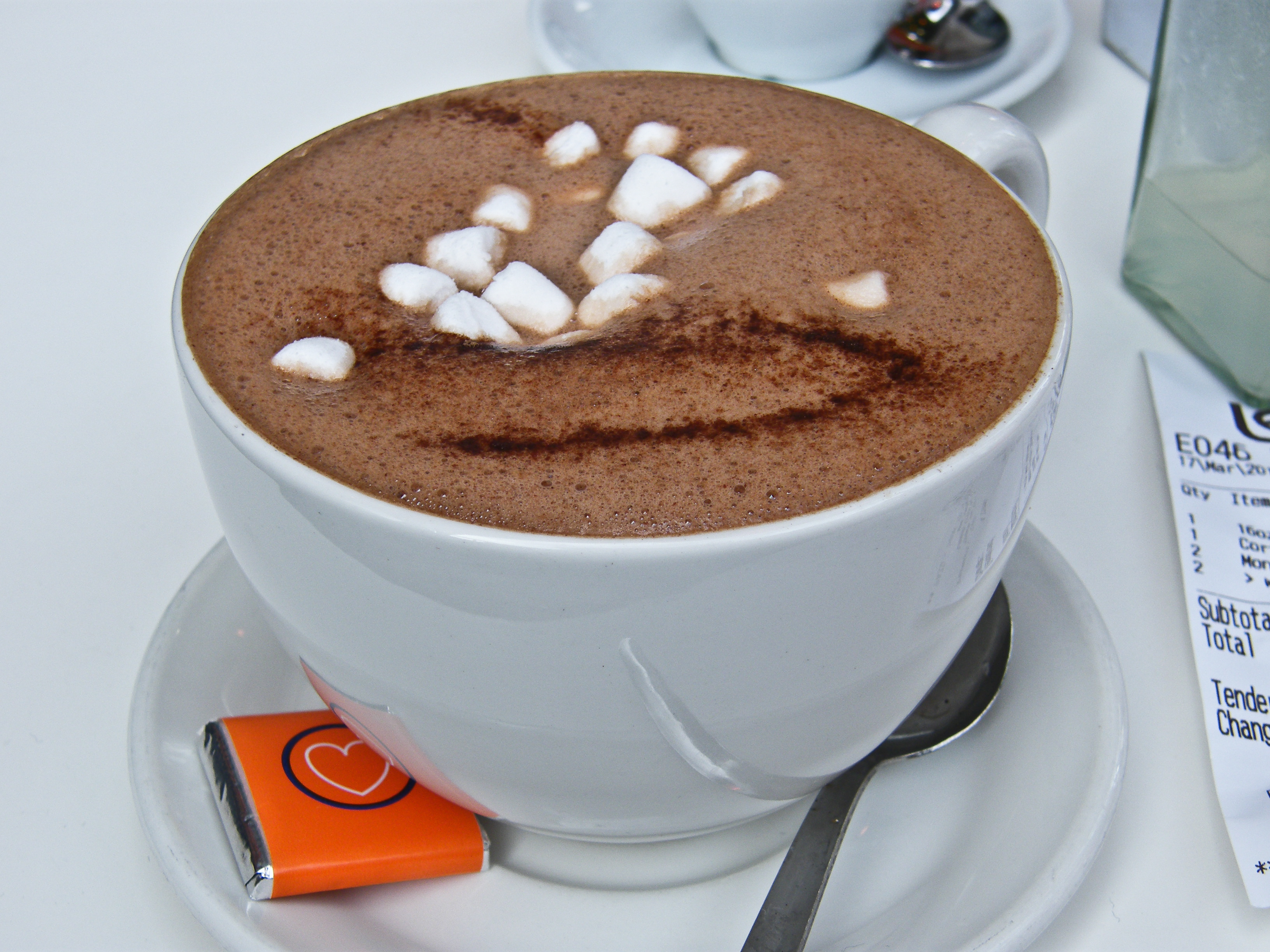
- A cup of hot chocolate with marshmallows
- Color: Brown or chestnut
- Flavor: Chocolate
- Ingredients: Chocolate or cocoa powder, milk or water, sugar
- Related products: Chocolate milk

Hot chocolate, also known as hot cocoa or drinking chocolate, is a heated drink consisting of shaved or melted chocolate or cocoa powder, and heated milk or water. It usually contains a sweetener, such as sugar, and is often garnished with whipped cream or marshmallows or both. Hot chocolate made with melted chocolate is characterized by less sweetness and a thicker consistency.

Cacao was first domesticated at least 5,300 years ago, in the Mayo-Chinchipe culture in what is present-day Ecuador, and cacao beverages were consumed by the period 2,500–3,000 years ago by the Maya. A chocolate drink was an essential part of Aztec culture by 1400 AD. The drink became popular in Europe after being introduced from Mexico in the New World and has undergone multiple changes since then. Until the 19th century, hot chocolate was used medicinally to treat ailments such as liver and stomach diseases.

Hot chocolate is consumed throughout the world in versions including the spiced chocolate para mesa of Latin America, the very thick cioccolata calda served in Italy and chocolate a la taza served in Spain, and the thinner hot cocoa consumed in the United States. Prepared hot chocolate can be purchased from a range of establishments, including cafeterias, fast food restaurants, coffeehouses and teahouses. Powdered hot chocolate mixes, which can be added to boiling water or hot milk to make the drink at home, are sold at grocery stores and online.

== Terminology ==
Process of making homemade drinking chocolate

A distinction is sometimes made between "hot cocoa", made from cocoa powder (ground cacao beans from which much of the cocoa butter has been removed), and "hot chocolate", made directly from bar chocolate, which already contains cocoa, sugar, and cocoa butter. Thus, the major difference between the two is the cocoa butter, the absence of which makes hot cocoa significantly lower in fat than hot chocolate while still preserving all the antioxidants found in chocolate.

- Hot chocolate can be made with dark, semisweet, or bittersweet chocolate grated or chopped into small pieces and stirred into milk with the addition of sugar.
- Cocoa usually refers to a drink made with cocoa powder, hot milk or water, and sweetened to taste with sugar (or not sweetened at all).
- Instant hot chocolate or hot cocoa mix may be based on cocoa powder, powdered chocolate, or both; often includes powdered milk or comparable ingredients so it can be made without using milk; sugar or other sweeteners; and typically stabilizers and thickeners. However, mixes can vary widely (between countries and often between brands) in ingredients included, their ratio and their quality.

== History ==
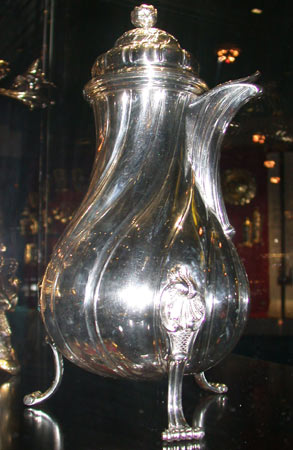
Silver chocolate pot, France, 1779. Victoria and Albert Museum, London.

The cacao tree was domesticated in around 3300 BCE, and has been used to make beverages since at least 700 BCE.

As of the early Classic period, cacao beverages were consumed by the wealthy from large "spouted vessels" that were often buried with elites. An early Classic period (460–480 AD) Mayan tomb from the site of Rio Azul, Guatemala, had vessels with the Maya glyph for cacao on them with residue of a cacao drink.

=== At the time of European contact ===
As the Europeans came upon the Americas, they found the Maya made a chocolate drink. Served cold, the Maya ground cocoa seeds into a paste and mixed it with water, vanilla, cornmeal, chili peppers, and other ingredients. They then poured the drink back and forth from a cup to a pot until a thick foam developed. It was available to Maya of all social classes, while among the Aztecs chocolate was a sign of high status: it was a bad omen for someone low or common to drink it.

Within Mesoamerica many drinks were made from cacao beans, and further flavored with flowers like vanilla. The Aztecs, or Mexica, required conquered people to provide them with chocolate. Cups, gourds, cacao beans, as well as other things they acquired were listed in The Essential Codex Mendoza. Cacao became used as a currency throughout Mesoamerica.

Chocolate was initially considered an acquired taste among conquistadors. The drink tasted spicy and bitter as opposed to sweetened modern hot chocolate, and José de Acosta, a Spanish Jesuit missionary who lived in Peru and then Mexico in the later 16th century, described chocolate as:

Loathsome to such as are not acquainted with it, having a scum or froth that is very unpleasant taste. Yet it is a drink very much esteemed among the Indians, where with they feast noble men who pass through their country. The Spaniards, both men and women, that are accustomed to the country, are very greedy of this Chocolate. They say they make diverse sorts of it, some hot, some cold, and some temperate, and put therein much of that "chili"; yea, they make paste thereof, the which they say is good for the stomach and against the catarrh.

=== Introduction to Europe ===
After its introduction to Europe, the drink slowly gained popularity. The imperial court of Emperor Charles V soon adopted the drink, and chocolate became a fashionable drink popular with the Spanish upper class. Additionally, cocoa was given as a dowry when members of the Spanish royal family married other European aristocrats. At the time, chocolate was very expensive in Europe because the cocoa beans only grew in South America.

Hot chocolate had become a luxury item among the European nobility by the 17th century. Even when the first Chocolate House (an establishment similar to a modern coffee shop) opened in 1657, chocolate was still very expensive, costing 50 to 75 pence (approximately 10–15 shillings) a pound (roughly £45–65 in 2016). At the time, hot chocolate was often mixed with spices for flavor; one notable recipe was hot chocolate "infused with fresh jasmine flowers, amber, musk, vanilla and ambergris." In the late 17th century, Sir Hans Sloane, president of the Royal College of Physicians, visited Jamaica, where he was introduced to cocoa. He found it 'nauseous' but by mixing it with milk made it more palatable. When Sloane returned to England, he brought the recipe with him, introducing milk chocolate to England. The aristocratic nature of the drink led to chocolate being referred to as "the drink of the gods" in 1797.

The Spanish began to use jicaras made of porcelain in place of the hollowed gourds used by the natives. They then further tinkered with the recipes by using spices such as cinnamon, black pepper, anise, and sesame. Many of these things were used to try to recreate the flavor of the native flowers which they could not easily acquire. Black pepper was used to replace chillies and mecaxochitl, cinnamon was used in place of orejuelas, sugar replaced honey.

In 1828, Coenraad Johannes van Houten developed the first cocoa powder-producing machine in the Netherlands. The press separated the greasy cocoa butter from cacao seeds, leaving a purer chocolate powder behind. This powder was easier to stir into milk and water. By using cocoa powder and low amounts of cocoa butter, it was also possible to manufacture chocolate bars. The term chocolate then came to mean solid chocolate rather than hot chocolate, with the first chocolate bar being created in 1847.

According to tradition, the Italian version cioccolata calda was first born in Turin around 1560: to celebrate that the capital of the Duchy of Savoy was moved from Chambéry to Turin, Emmanuel Philibert, Duke of Savoy asked for a new beverage, and so this thicker, creamy version was created.

== Gallery ==
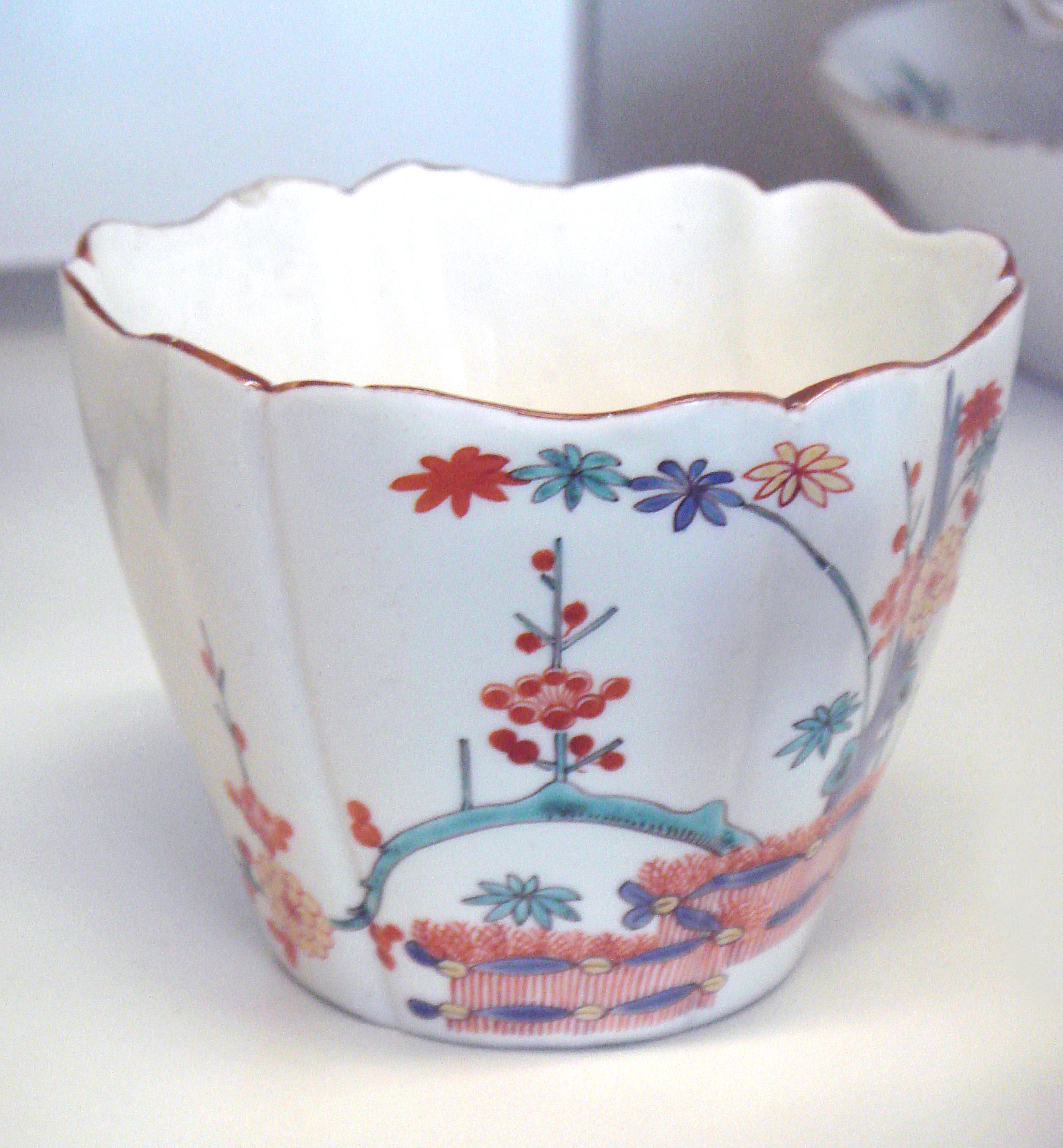
Chocolate cup, Chantilly porcelain, 18th century

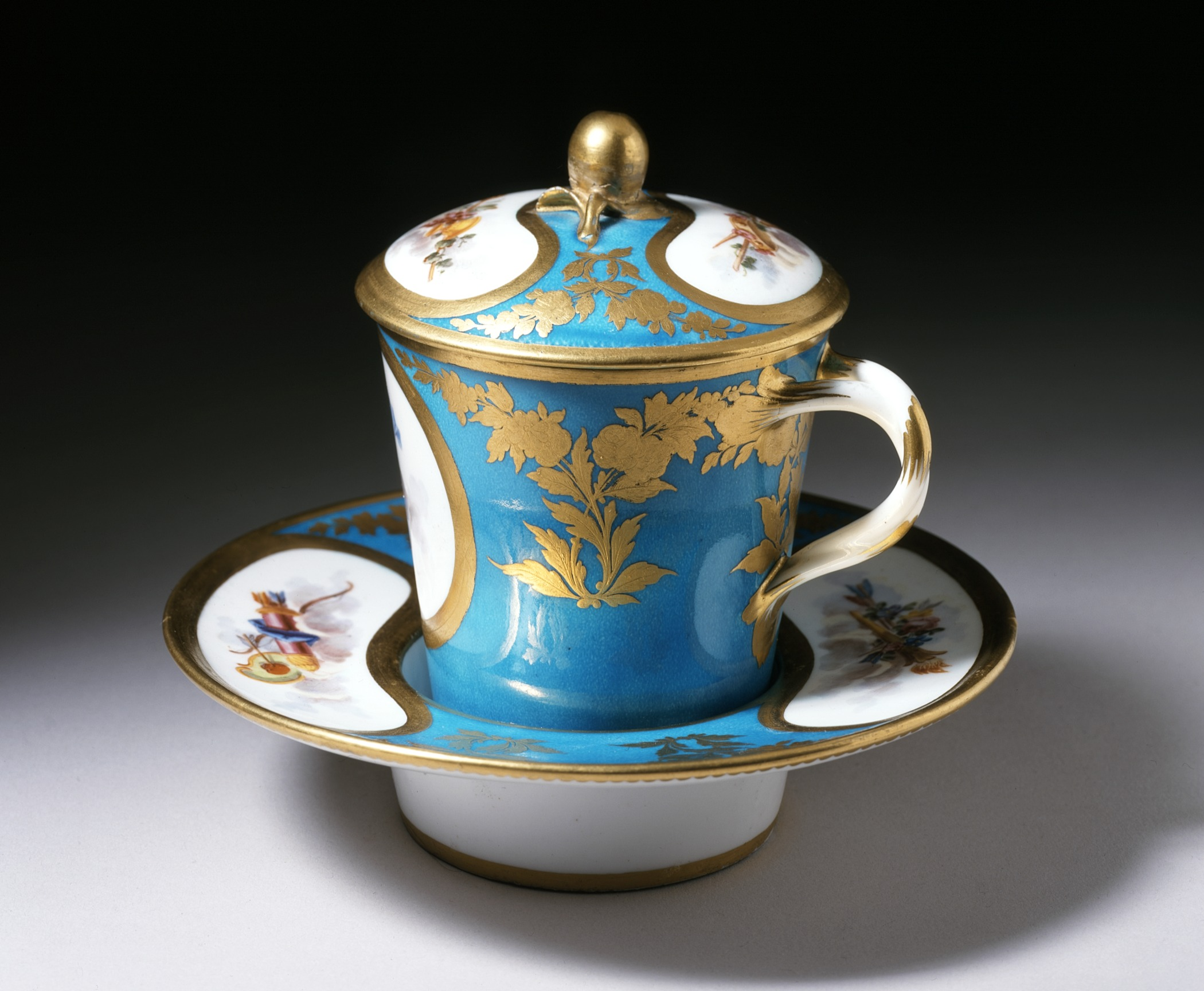
Trembleuse or Gobelet et soucoupe enfoncé by Sèvres c. 1776 designed for drinking hot chocolate

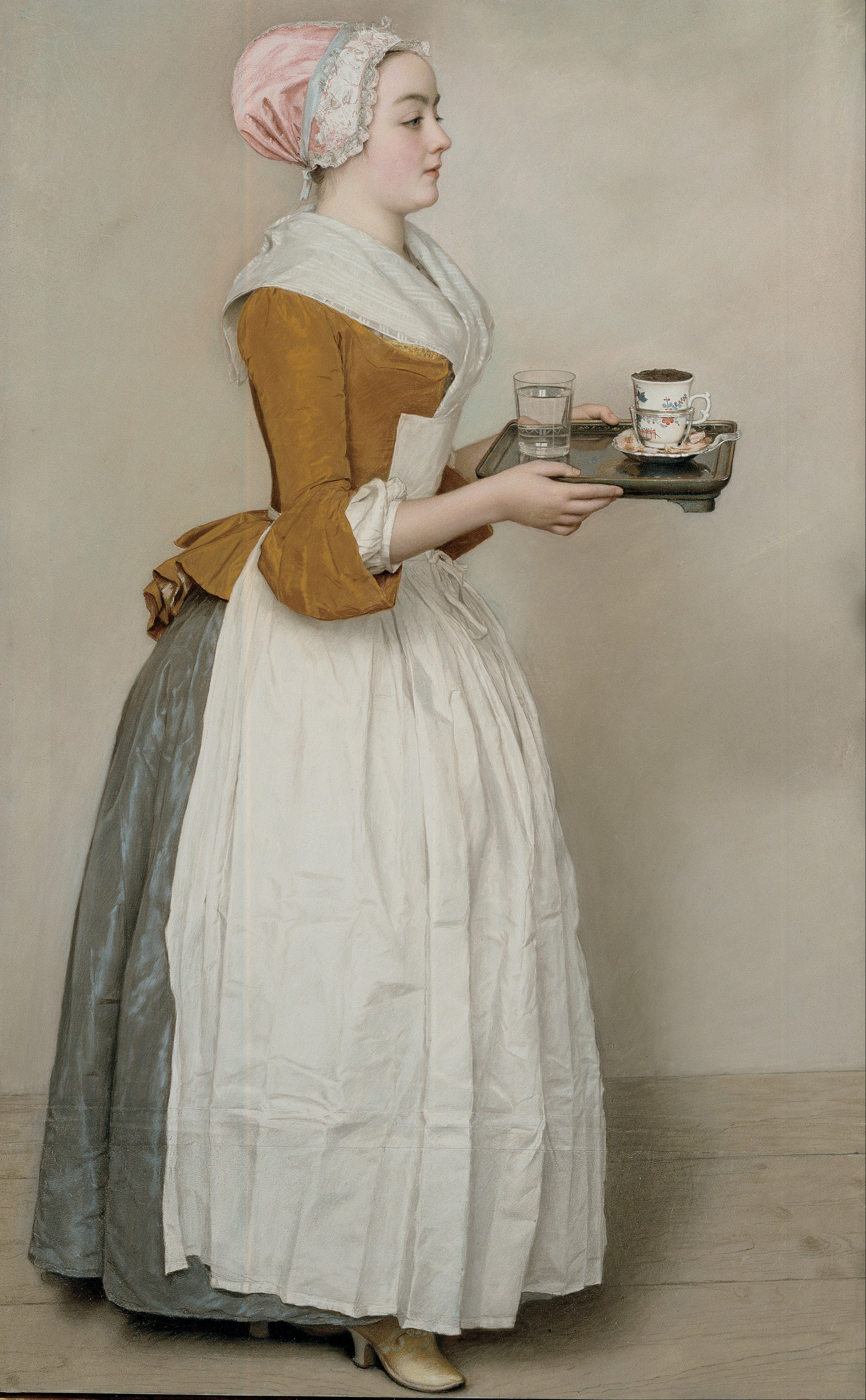
The Chocolate Girl. Jean-Étienne Liotard, circa 1744

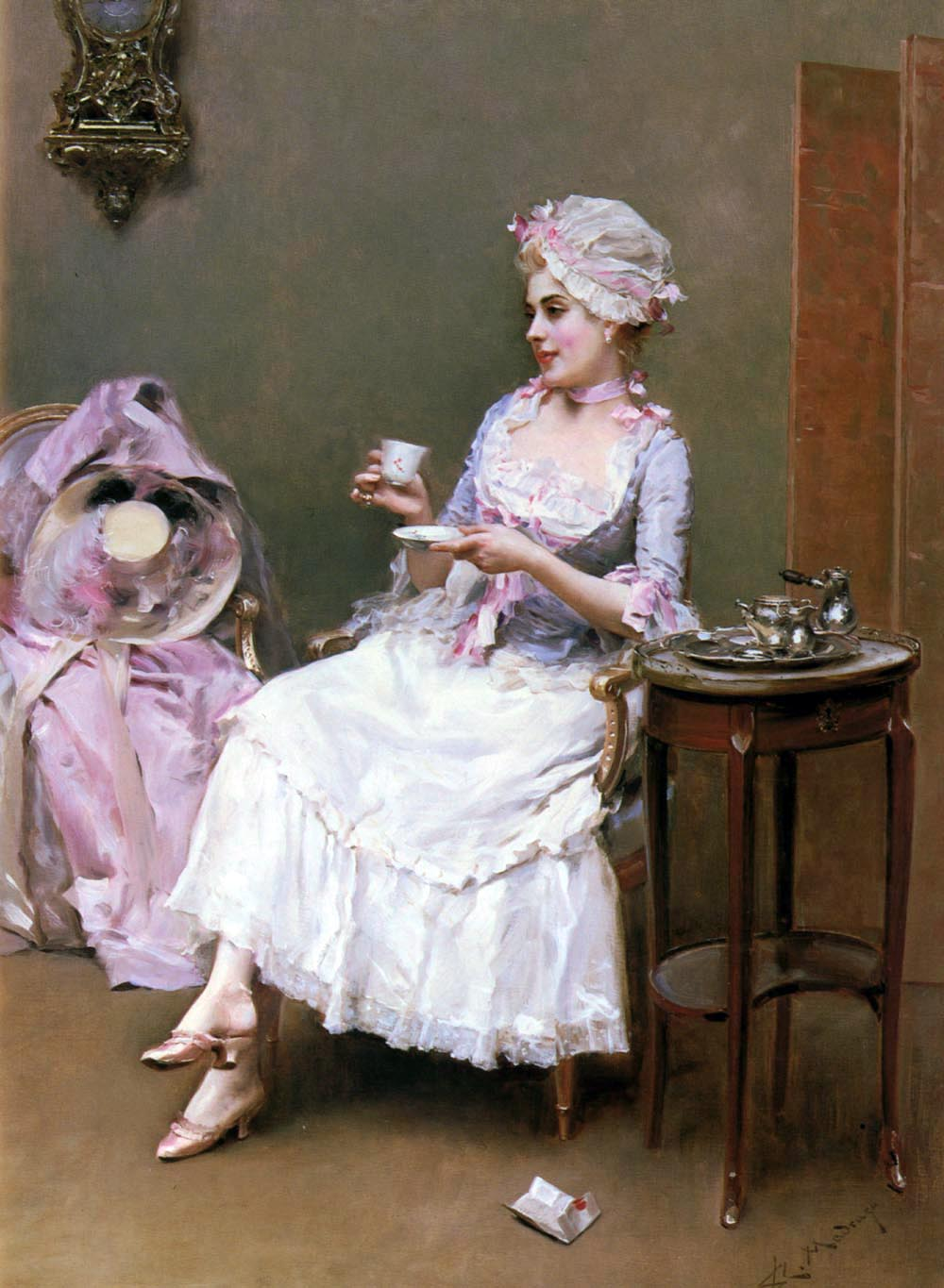
A woman (Aline Masson) drinking a cup of chocolate, in a canvas by Raimundo Madrazo

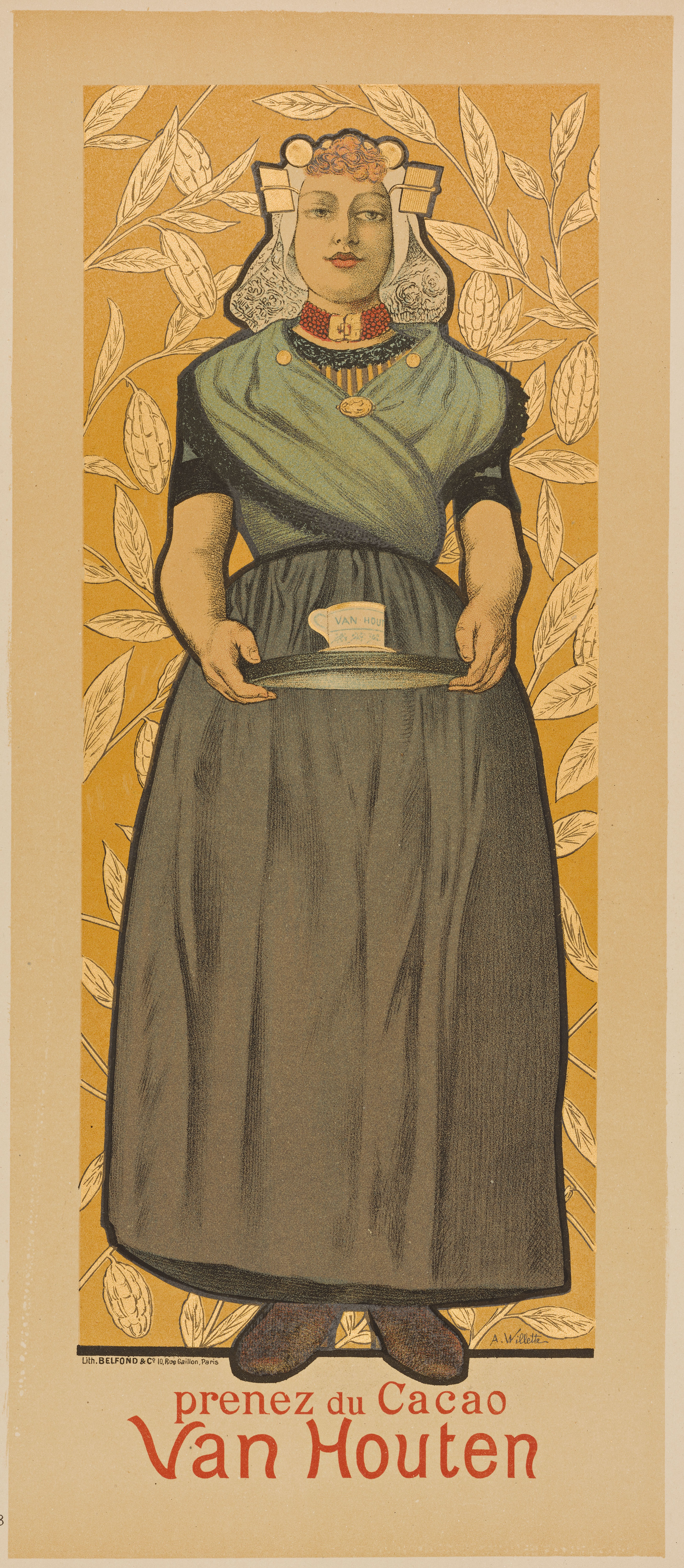
Cacao Van Houten. Poster by Adolphe Willette, 1893

== Consumption ==
Hot chocolate
Nutritional value per 100 g
- Energy: 322.168 kJ (77.000 kcal)
- Carbohydrates: 10.74 g
- Sugars: 9.66 g
- Dietary fiber: 1 g
- Fat: 2.34 g
- Saturated: 1.431 g
- Trans: 0.078 g
- Monounsaturated: 0.677 g
- Polyunsaturated: 0.084 g
- Protein: 3.52 g
- Phenylalanine: 0.150 g
- Tyrosine: 0.141 g
Vitamins and minerals
Vitamins	Quantity %DV^{†}
Vitamin A equiv.	6% 51 μg
Vitamin A	176 IU
Thiamine (B1)	3% 0.039 mg
Riboflavin (B2)	14% 0.182 mg
Niacin (B3)	1% 0.133 mg
Vitamin B6	2% 0.04 mg
Folate (B9)	1% 5 μg
Vitamin B12	20% 0.49 μg
Vitamin C	0% 0.2 mg
Vitamin D	6% 1.1 μg
Vitamin D	6% 45 IU
Vitamin E	0% 0.03 mg
Vitamin K	0% 0.2 μg
Minerals	Quantity %DV^{†}
Calcium	9% 114 mg
Iron	2% 0.42 mg
Magnesium	5% 23 mg
Phosphorus	8% 105 mg
Potassium	7% 197 mg
Sodium	2% 44 mg
Zinc	6% 0.63 mg
- Other constituents: Quantity
- Water: 82.45 g
- Caffeine: 2 mg
- Cholesterol: 8 mg
- ^{†}Percentages estimated using US recommendations for adults, except for potassium, which is estimated based on expert recommendation from the National Academies. Source: Milk, chocolate beverage, hot cocoa, homemade – USDA FoodData Central

Today, hot chocolate in the form of drinking chocolate or cocoa is considered a comfort food and is widely consumed in many parts of the world. European hot chocolate tends to be relatively thick and rich, while in the United States the thinner instant version is consumed more often. Many regions have distinctive additives or toppings, ranging from marshmallow and whipped cream to cheese.

=== Add-ons ===
Whipped cream and marshmallows are frequently added to hot chocolate. Theobromine found in the fat-free cocoa solids of the cocoa bean is fat soluble. Cocoa beans contain significant amount of fats, but cocoa powder is usually defatted. However, adding fat to defatted cocoa powder will increase its bioavailability.

Rum is added to hot chocolate to make a Lumumba.

=== Europe ===
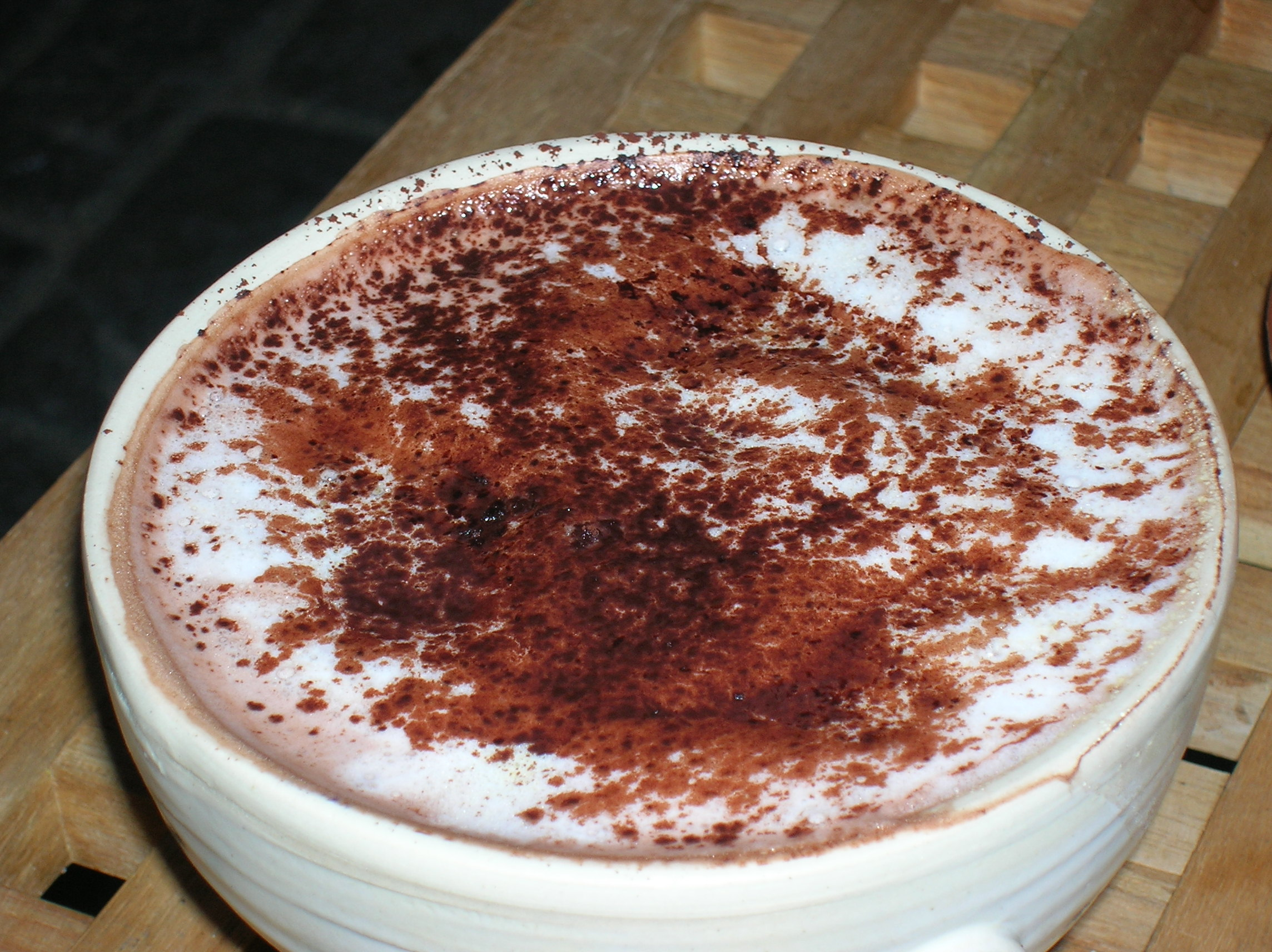
Hot chocolate is called warme chocolademelk in the Netherlands.

In mainland Europe (particularly Spain and Italy), hot chocolate is sometimes served very thick due to the use of a thickening agent such as cornstarch. One of the thick forms of hot chocolate served in Europe is the Italian cioccolata calda.

Hot chocolate with churros is a traditional breakfast in Spain. This style of hot chocolate can be extremely thick, often having the consistency of warm chocolate pudding. In the Netherlands, hot chocolate is a very popular drink, known as warme chocolademelk. It is often served at home or in cafes. In France, hot chocolate is often served at breakfast time. Sometimes sliced bread spread with butter, jam, honey, or Nutella is dunked into the hot chocolate.

In Germany, hot chocolate made by melted chocolate (Heiße Schokolade Wiener Art) is distinguished from those made from powders (Trinkschokolade). It is often served with whipped cream on top.

Even further variations of hot chocolate exist. In some cafes in Belgium and other areas in Europe, one who orders a warme chocolade or chocolat chaud receives a cup of steaming white milk and a small bowl of bittersweet chocolate chips to dissolve in the milk. One Viennese variant, Heiße Schokolade Wiener Art, contains an egg yolk for thickness.

=== Asia ===
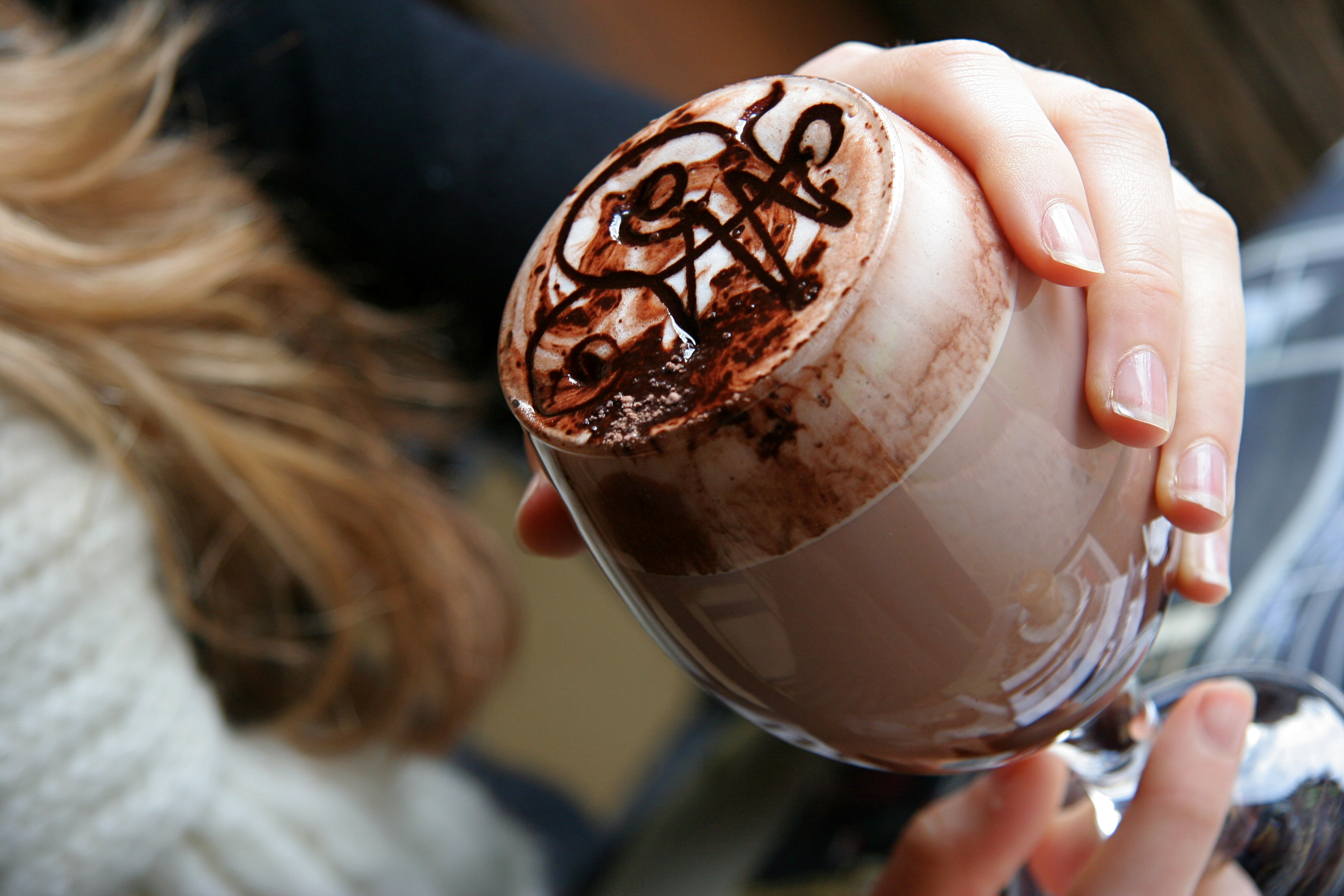
Hot chocolate in Montsalvat, Melbourne.

==== Spanish East Indies ====
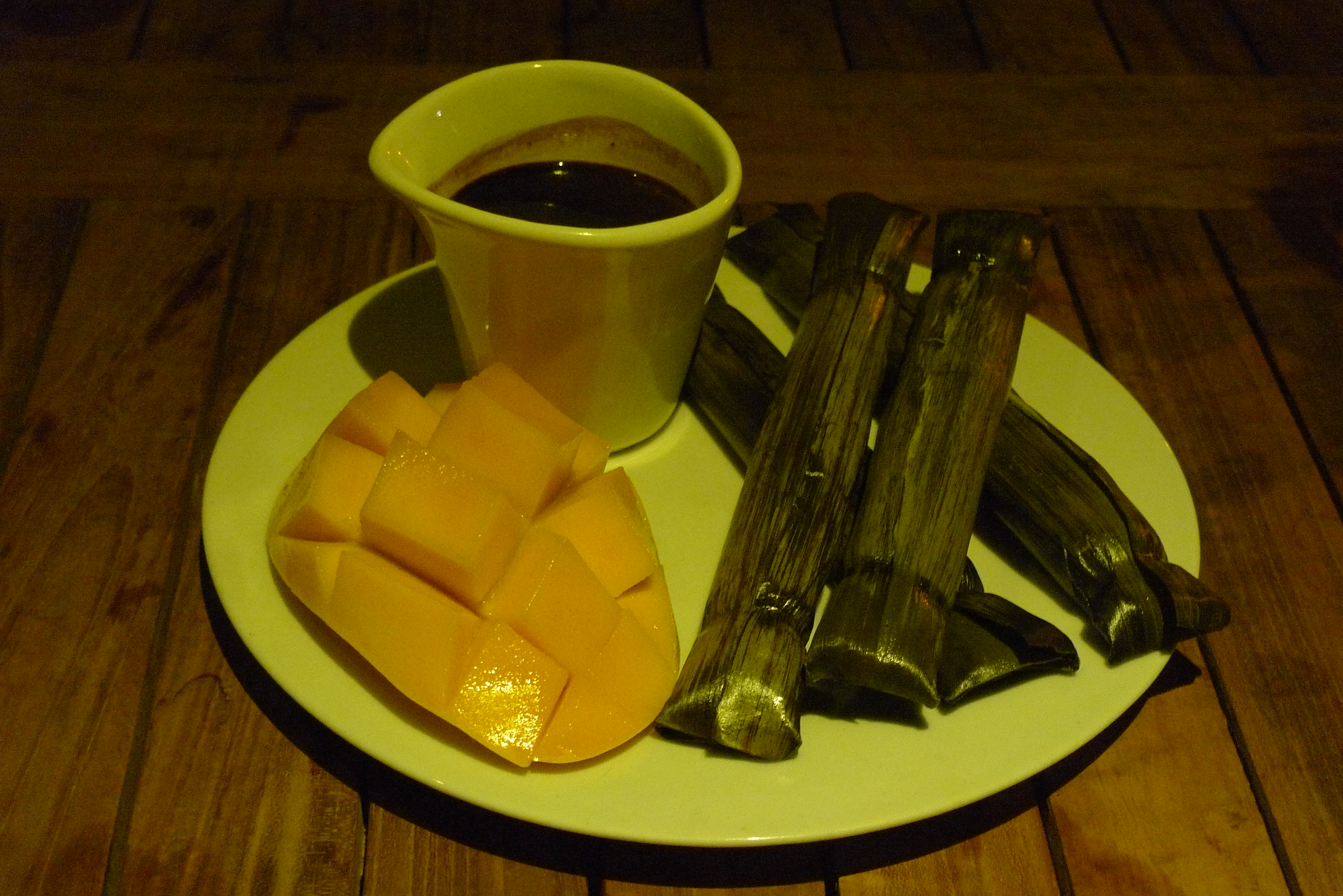
Filipino tsokolate with suman rice cakes and ripe carabao mangoes

In the Philippines, the native hot chocolate drink is known as tsokolate. It is made from tabliya (or tablea), tablets of pure ground roasted cacao beans, dissolved in water and milk. Like in Spanish and Latin American versions, the drink is traditionally made in a tsokolatera and briskly mixed with a wooden baton called the molinillo (also called batidor or batirol), causing the drink to be characteristically frothy. Tsokolate is typically sweetened with a bit of muscovado sugar and has a distinctive grainy texture.

Tsokolate is also known as suklati in Kapampangan; sikulate in Maguindanao; and sikwate or sikuwate in Visayan languages. All are derived from Spanish chocolate ('chocolate').

Tsokolate is commonly consumed at breakfast with traditional kakanin delicacies or pandesal and other types of bread. It is also popular during Christmas season in the Philippines.

=== North America ===
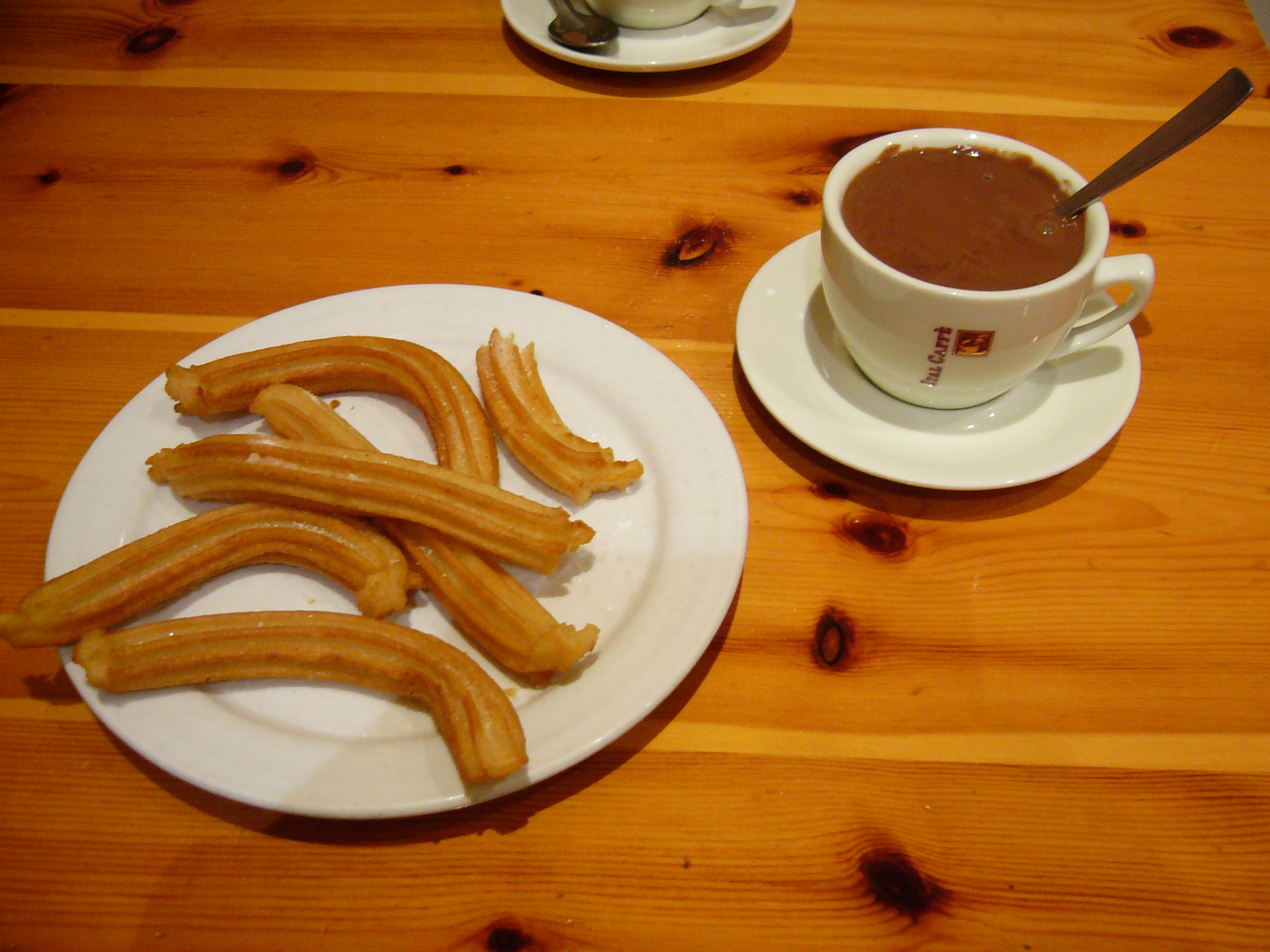
Traditional Spanish hot chocolate served with churros

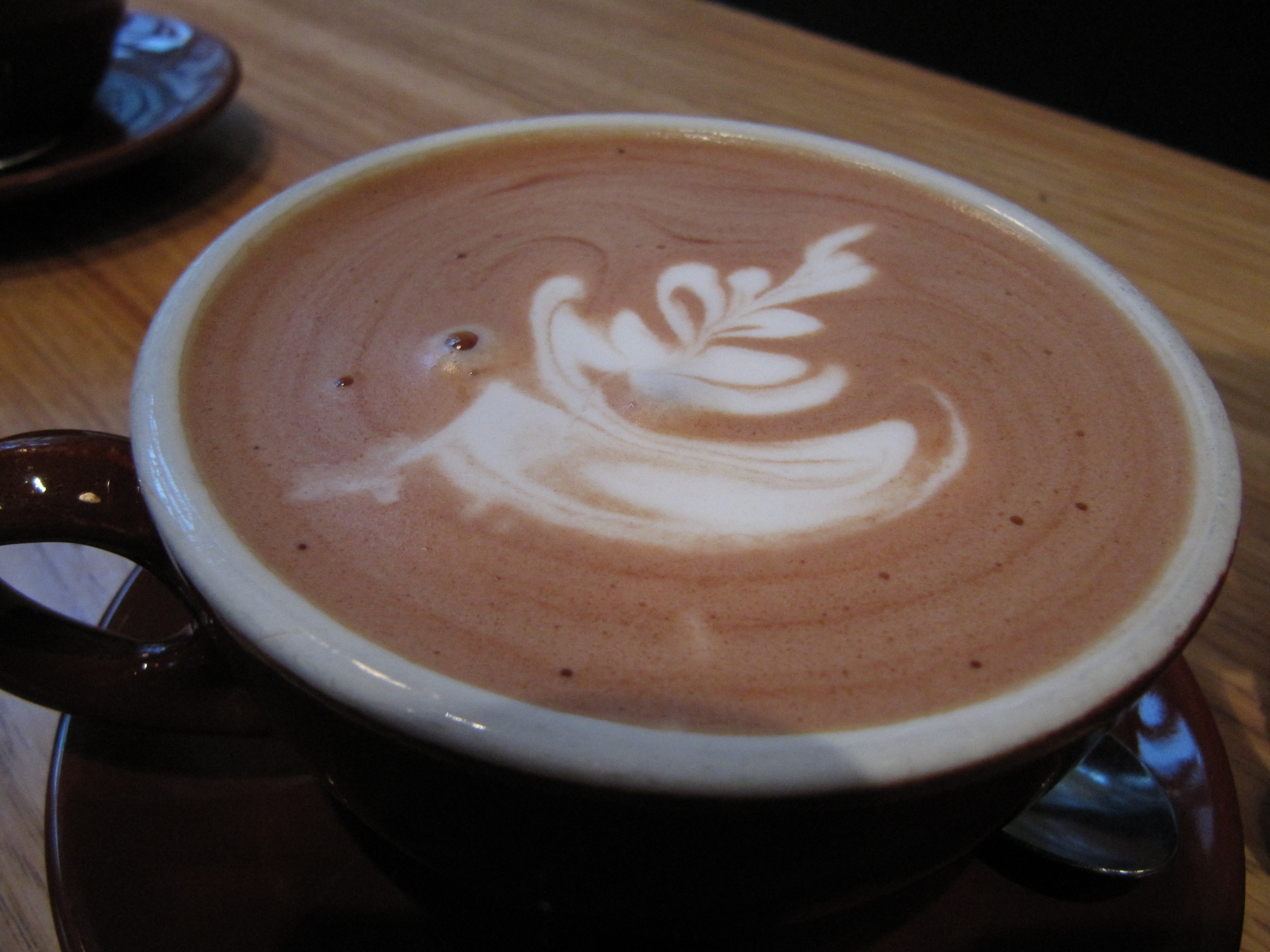
Latte art on hot chocolate

In the United States and Canada, the drink is popular in instant form, made with hot water or milk from a packet containing mostly cocoa powder, sugar, and dry milk. This is the thinner of the two main variations. It is very sweet and may be topped with marshmallows, whipped cream, or a piece of solid chocolate. Hot chocolate was first brought to North America as early as the 17th century by the Dutch, but the first time colonists began selling hot chocolate was around 1755. Traditionally, hot chocolate has been associated with cold weather and winter in the United States and Canada.

Hot chocolate mixed with espresso or coffee under the name of caffè mocha is sold in coffee shops around the United States and elsewhere. This particular name comes from the town Mocha, Yemen, where a specific blend of coffee with the same name is grown.

In Mexico, hot chocolate often includes semi-sweet chocolate, cinnamon, sugar, and vanilla. Hot chocolate is considered by some to be a children's drink, although consuming it with tamales is common among all ages. Hot chocolate of this type is commonly sold in circular or hexagonal tablets which can be dissolved into hot milk, water, or cream, and then blended until the mixture develops a creamy froth. A 1942 article in the Chicago Tribune describes Mexican cinnamon hot chocolate as being traditionally served alongside a variety of sweet Mexican pastries, such as pan dulce or churros.

=== South America ===
In Colombia, a hot chocolate drink made with milk and water using a chocolatera and molinillo is enjoyed as part of breakfast with bread and soft, fresh farmer's cheese. Colombian hot chocolate is often topped with a soft farmer's cheese or other mild cheese. Similarly, hot chocolate in Ecuador is often topped with cheese.

In Peru, hot chocolate can be served with panettone at breakfast on Christmas Day, even though summer has already started in the southern hemisphere. In addition, many Peruvians will add a sweet chocolate syrup to their drink.

The Argentinian submarino is a hot chocolate drink made from adding a chocolate bar and sugar to hot steamed milk.

Also numerous documents reveal medicinal uses of cacao throughout Central and South America in which different components of the tree are still used today, in the late 20th and early 21st century, including cacao bark, fat, flowers, fruit pulp and leaves.

=== Africa ===
In Nigeria and Jamaica, hot chocolate is referred to as "tea" due to customs of referring to drinks consumed in the morning as "tea". Alongside coffee, hot chocolate is a popular drink in urban areas of the Ivory Coast to accompany French-style breakfasts that Ivorians sometimes eat.

== See also ==
- Cacao beverage
- Cuestión moral: si el chocolate quebranta el ayuno eclesiástico (Whether chocolate breaks ecclesiastical fast: a moral question)
- Hot chocolate effect
- List of chocolate drinks
  - Champurrado, hot chocolate's Mexican counterpart
  - Chocolate milk
- List of hot drinks
