= Cuestión moral: si el chocolate quebranta el ayuno eclesiástico =

1636 book by Antonio de León Pinelo

Cuestión Moral. Si el chocolate quebranta el ayuno eclesiástico
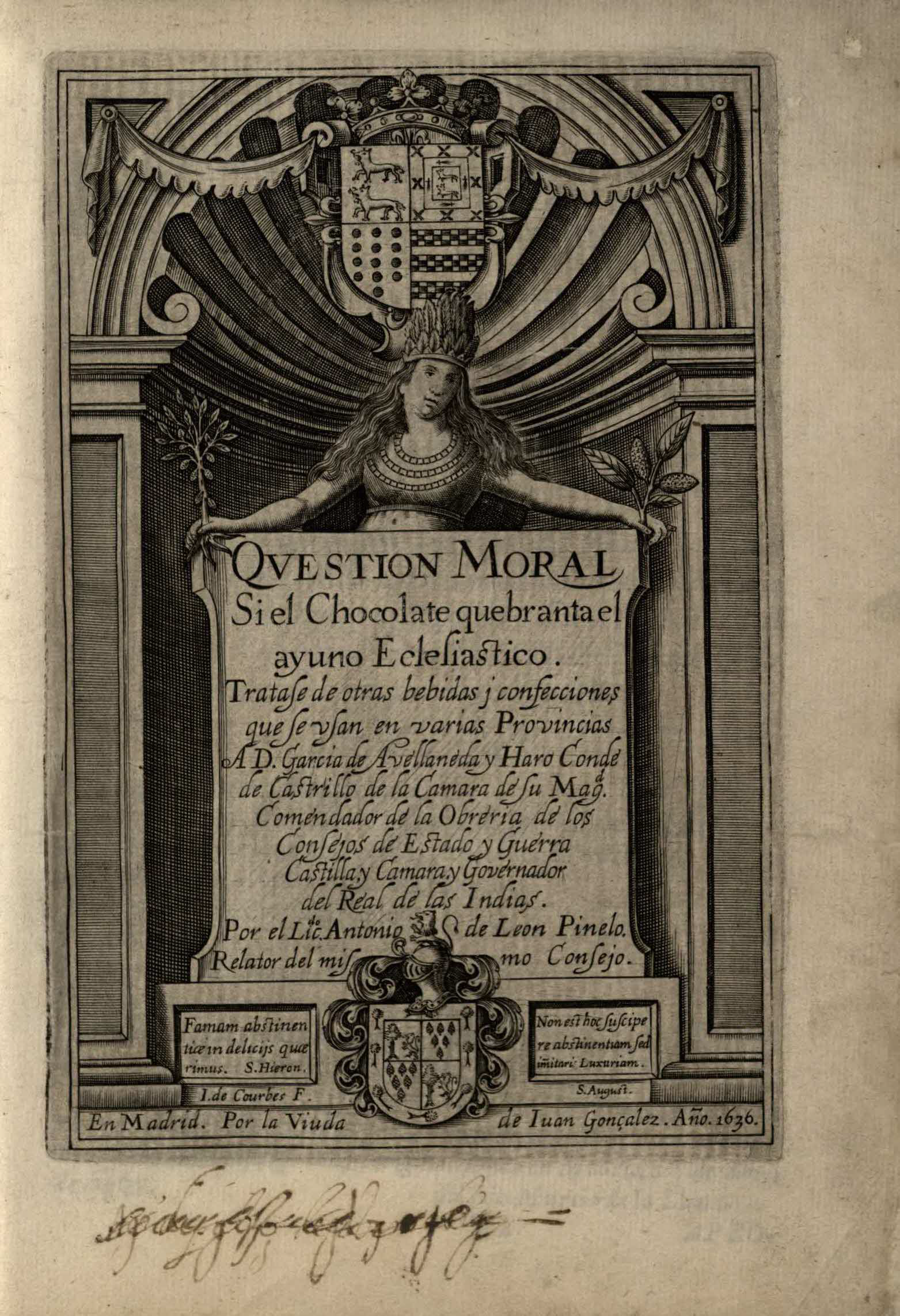
- Author: Antonio de León Pinelo
- Original title: Qvestion Moral. Si el chocolate quebranta el ayuno eclesiástico
- Publication place: Mexico

Cuestión moral: si el chocolate quebranta el ayuno eclesiástico (in English: Whether chocolate breaks ecclesiastical fast: a moral question) is a 1636 book written by the Spanish historian Antonio de León Pinelo about the role of chocolate beverages in European society in the 17th century.

== History ==
This book was written during the 17th century, a time when chocolate became a very popular drink in Spain. The chocolate drink was introduced among the Mexican religious, and later, in the highest social ranks of the European society. There were controversies at the time among the ecclesiastical authorities about the supposed stimulating effect of the beverage, thus its consumption in the churches was prohibited in 1681.

== Content ==
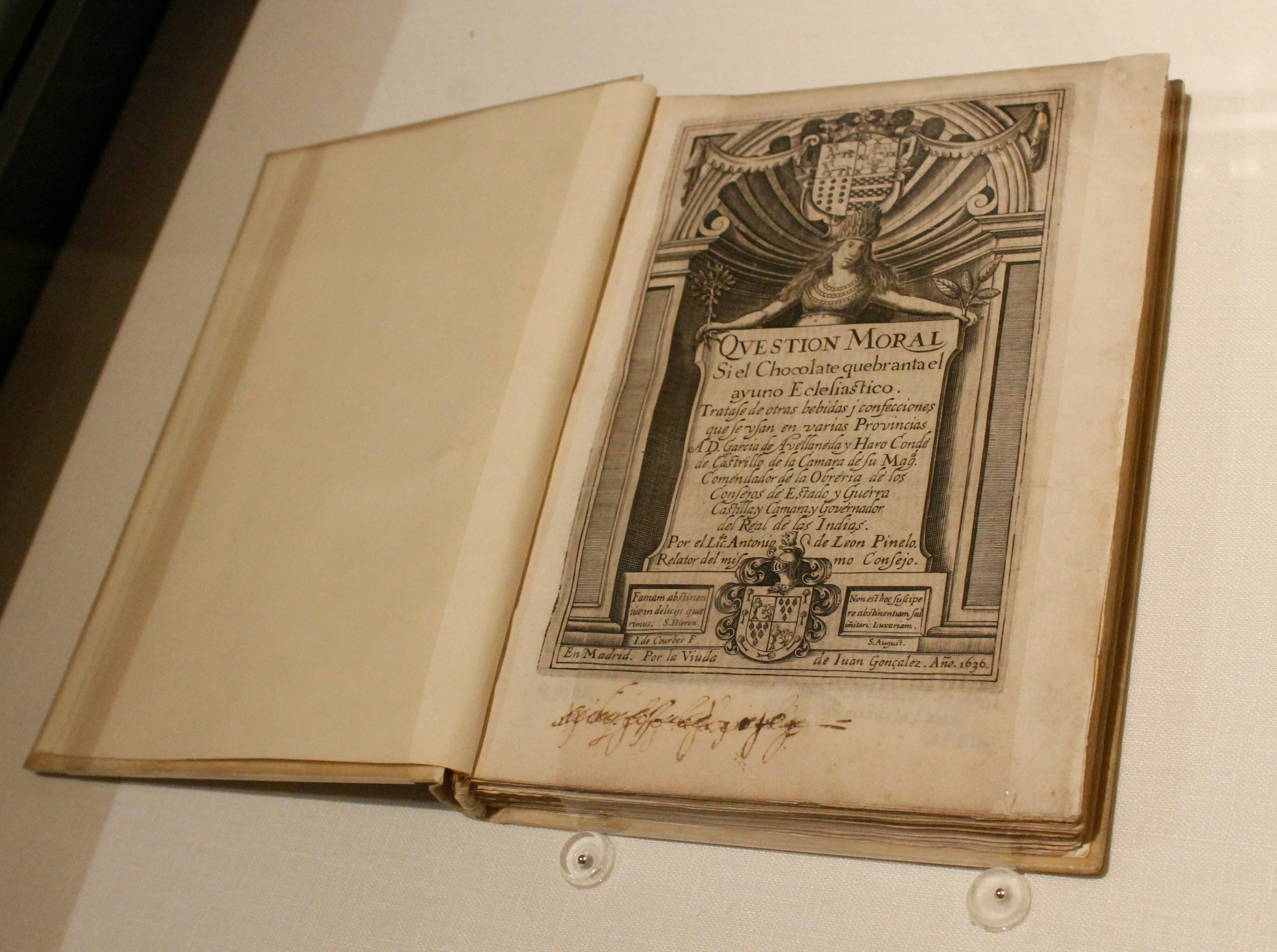
Cuestión Moral. Si el chocolate quebranta el ayuno eclesiástico, in the Museo Soumaya's collection.

The book explores the temptations, fantasies and fears associated with the chocolate drink, a beverage that caused furor in Madrid at the beginning of the 17th century. The author explores different views on the same object of desire, chocolate, included the views of theologists and moralists who had never tasted the beverage. This collection of opinions, often opposite and thus controversial, gives the book its value.

Pinelo's work explored the role of the chocolate beverage at the time. According to Mexican historian Antonio Rubel García, chocolate consumption was framed in a discussion between those who perceived the things brought from the Americas as "decadent, putrid, imperfect", and those who defended its virtues and beauty.

The book indicates the chocolate beverage was discovered by the pre-Hispanic indigenous, who used it in their rituals and exclusively by their nobility and their priests. When the Spaniards adopted the chocolate beverage, they modified it by adding products such as sugar, vanilla, and cinnamon, besides extending its consumption to all social stratums.

Chocolate became a mechanism of socialization and festivity, thus triggering its prohibition within the Carmelite convents, where it was considered against the rules of monastic life. Mexican historian M. Mercè Gras Casanova affirms chocolate drink was considered to be so extraordinary and exquisite that the religious authorities considered its consumption as a sin, because it was "in the antipodes of the rigor and the asceticism pretended by any good Christian."
