= Lumumba (drink) =

Long drink containing cocoa and rum

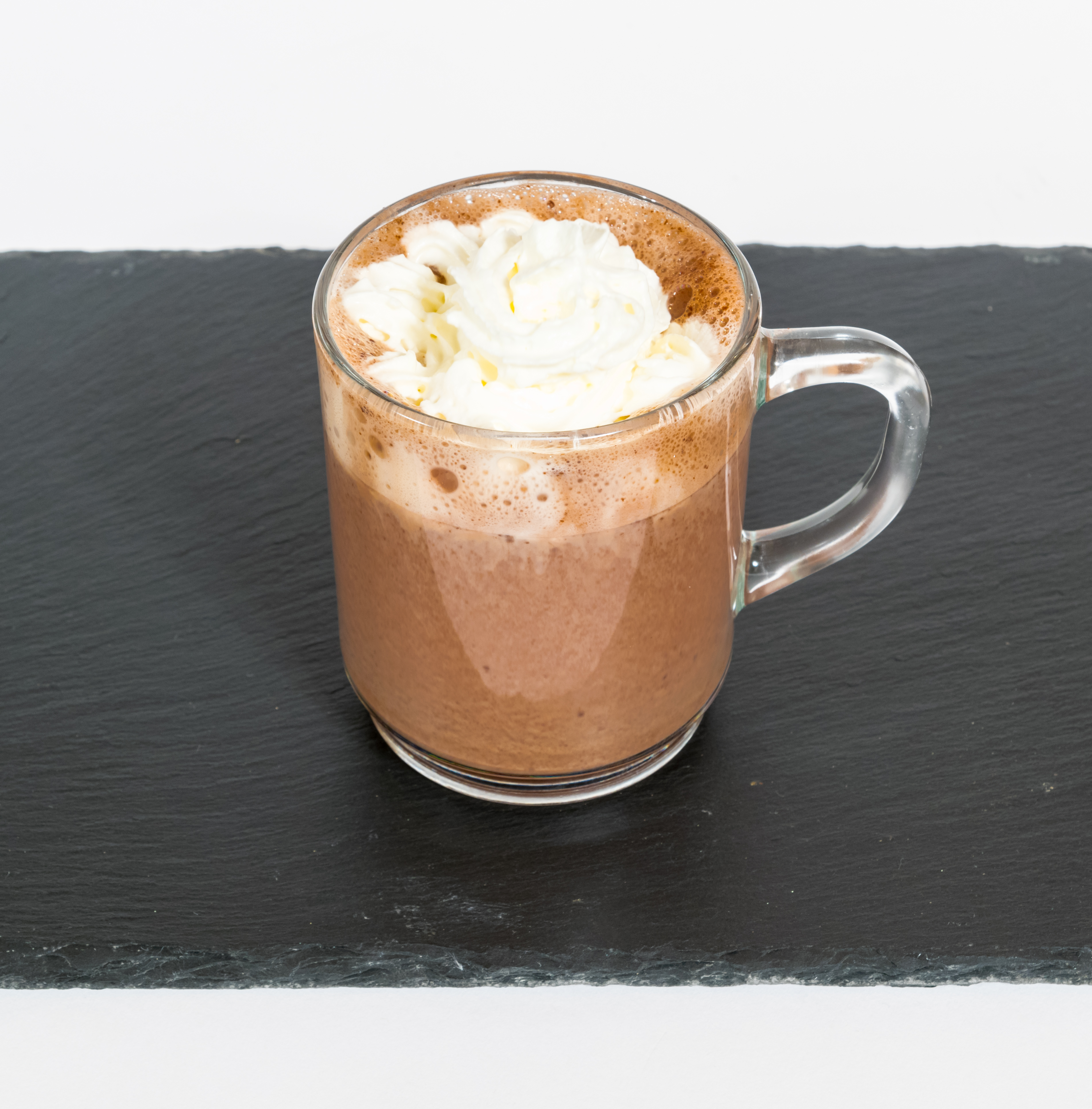
- Hot Lumumba with brandy
- Type: Long drink
- Ingredients: Cocoa, rum

A Lumumba (Død tante, German: Tote Tante [dead aunt]) is a long drink. The origin of its name is unknown; critics state the beverage containing a shot of rum is named after slain Congolese politician Patrice Lumumba (who was shot on 17 January 1961). The term Død tante/Tote Tante is used on the western coast of Denmark, Northern Germany and the Netherlands, where the drink is the counterpart to the Pharisäer with coffee.

The drink consists of cocoa, sometimes accompanied by cream, and a shot of rum. Some alternatives replace the rum with amaretto or brandy: a popular version in Spain during La Movida Madrileña used the local chocolate milk drinks Cacaolat or Okey with a shot of Spanish brandy, such as Fundador or Soberano. In Spain, it was considered as a "cheap" version of a Brandy Alexander.

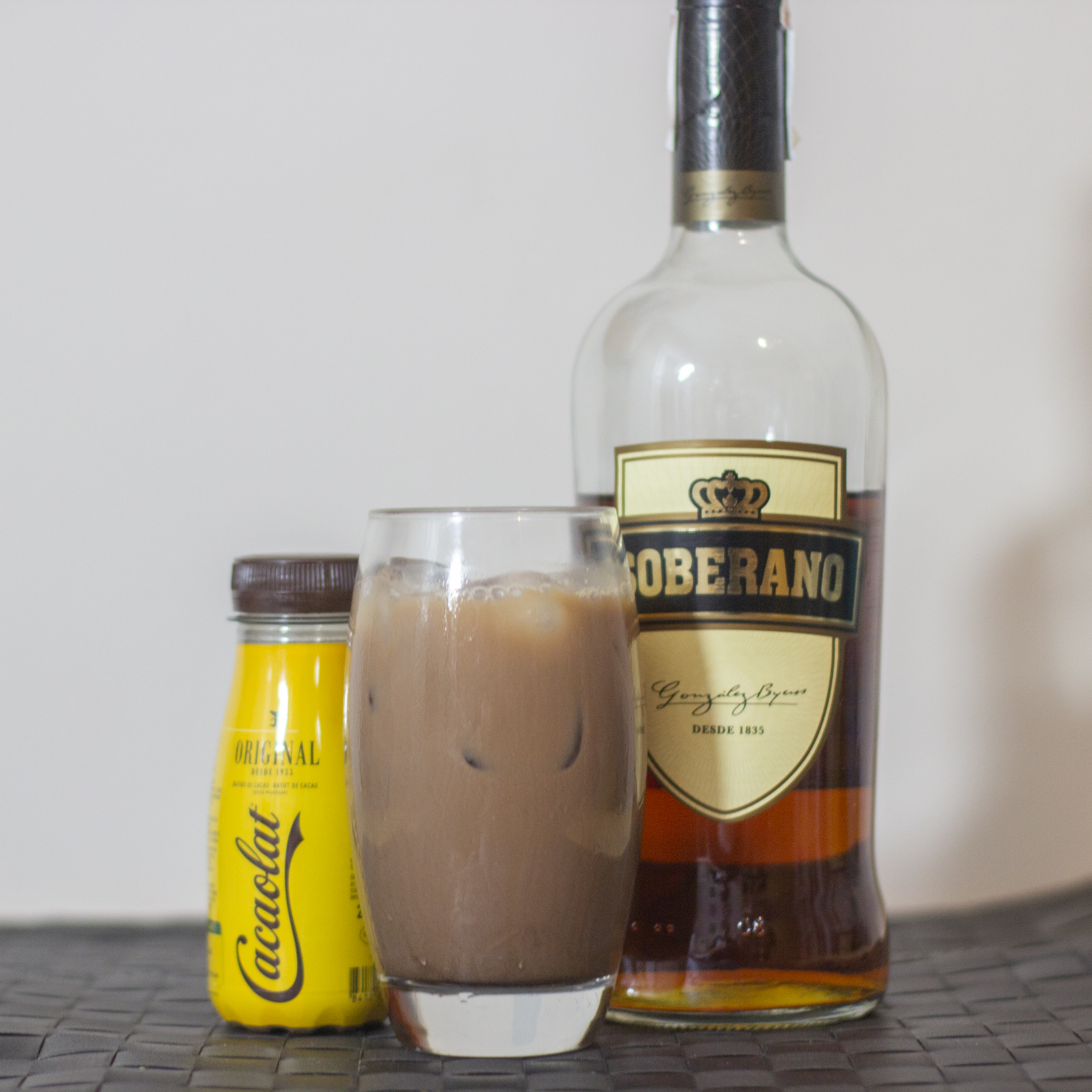
A Spanish-style Lumumba with its ingredients, a bottle of Cacaolat and a bottle of Soberano brandy.

Depending on whether the hot or cold cocoa is used, the result is a Hot Lumumba or a Cold Lumumba.
