= Hot chocolate effect =

Phenomenon of wave mechanics

Hot chocolate effect manifestation

The hot chocolate effect is a phenomenon of wave mechanics in which the pitch heard from tapping a cup of hot liquid rises after the addition of a soluble powder. The effect is thought to happen because upon initial stirring, entrained gas bubbles reduce the speed of sound in the liquid, lowering the frequency. As the bubbles clear, sound travels faster in the liquid and the frequency increases.

== Name ==
The effect was initially observed when making instant coffee and pouring beer, but also occurs in other situations such as adding salt to supersaturated hot water or cold beer. Recent research has found many more substances which create the effect, even in initially non-supersaturated liquids.

It was named and popularized by Frank Crawford of the Lawrence Berkeley National Laboratory starting in 1980 after the effect itself was pointed out to him by Nancy Steiner, though the effect had been reported several times in the preceding decades.

== Description ==
The effect can be observed by pouring hot milk or hot water into a mug, stirring in chocolate powder, and tapping the bottom of the mug with a spoon. The pitch of the taps will increase progressively with no relation to the speed or force of tapping. Subsequent stirring of the same solution (without adding more chocolate powder) will gradually decrease the pitch again, followed by another increase. This process can be repeated a number of times, until equilibrium has been reached.

== Explanation ==
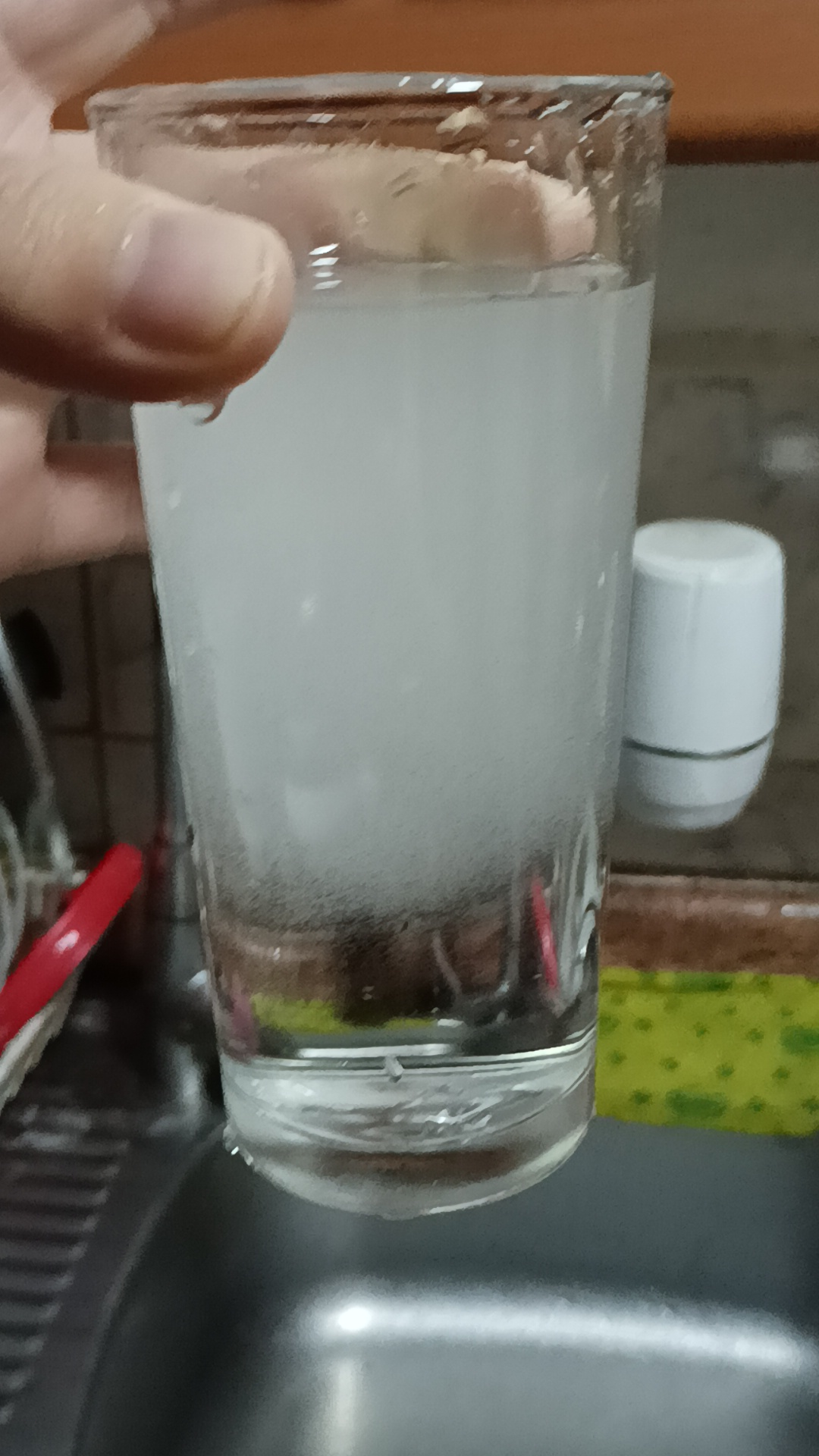
Glass of water with air bubbles in the upper portion. As the water clears, the pitch of the sound from tapping the glass increases

The phenomenon is explained by the effect of bubble density on the speed of sound in the liquid. The note heard is the frequency of a standing wave where a quarter wavelength is the distance between the base of the mug and the liquid surface. This frequency f is equal to the speed v of the wave divided by four times the height of the water column h:

$$f = \frac{1}{4}\frac{v}{h}$$

The speed of sound v in a homogeneous liquid or gas is dependent on the fluid's mass density ($\rho$) and adiabatic bulk modulus ($K$), according to the Newton-Laplace formula:

$$v = \sqrt{\frac{K}{\rho}}$$

Water is approximately 800 times denser than air, and air is approximately 15,000 times more compressible than water. (Compressibility is the inverse of the bulk modulus $K$.) When water is filled with air bubbles, the fluid's density is still very close to the density of water, but the compressibility will be the compressibility of air. This greatly reduces the speed of sound in the liquid. Wavelength is constant for a given volume of fluid; therefore the frequency (pitch) of the sound will decrease as long as gas bubbles are present.

Different rates of bubble formation will generate different acoustic profiles, allowing differentiation of the added solutes.

== See also ==
- Broadband acoustic resonance dissolution spectroscopy, a spectroscopic technique that uses the effect as its fundamental principle.
