= Molinillo (whisk) =

Latin American whisk made of wood

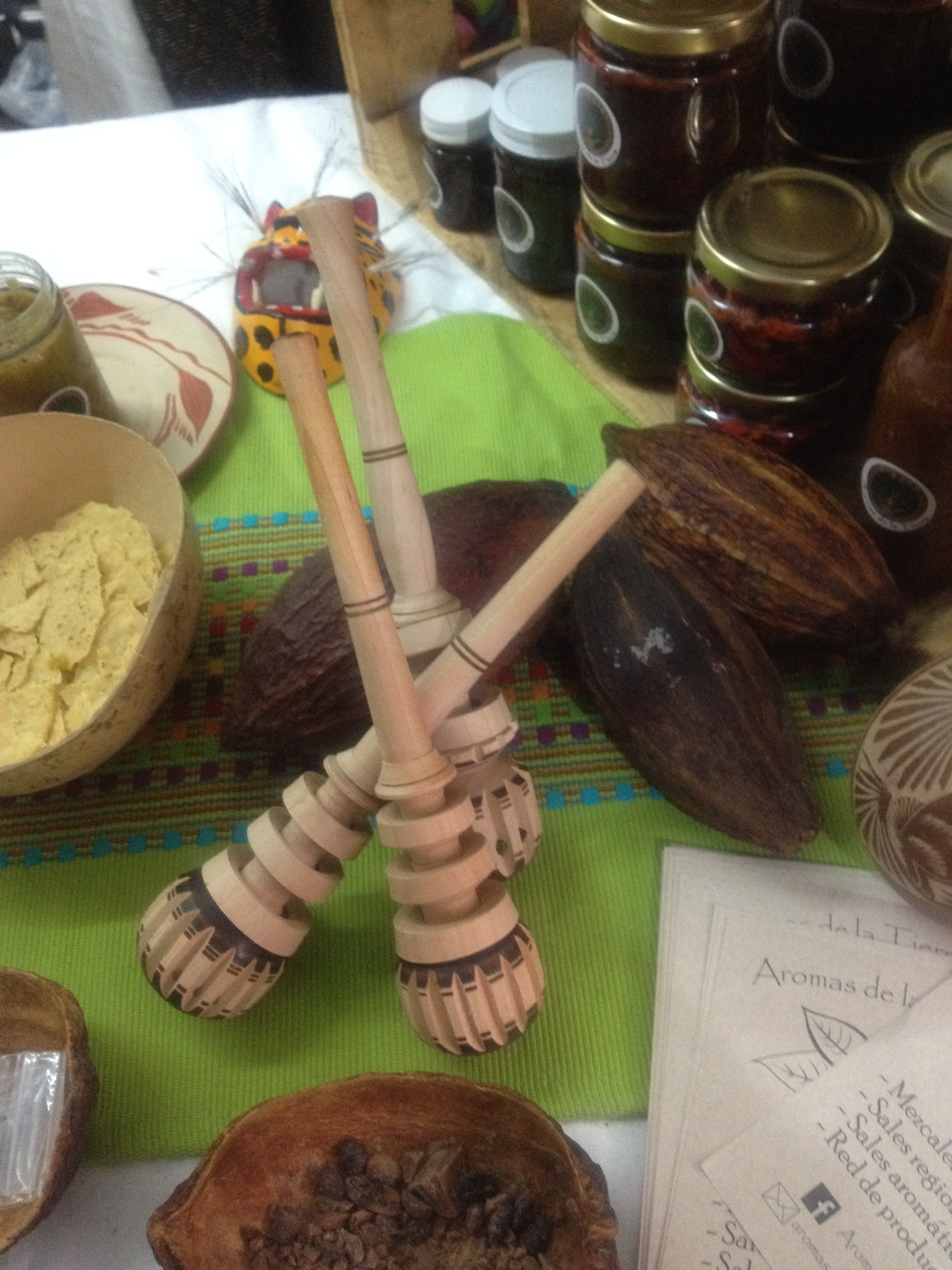
Molinillos made in Guerrero, Mexico

A molinillo is a traditional turned wood whisk used in Latin America, as well as the Philippines, where it is also called a batirol or batidor. Its use is principally for the preparation of hot beverages such as hot chocolate, atole, cacao, and champurrado. The molinillo is held between the palms and rotated by rubbing the palms together; this rotation creates the froth in the drink. This process is the subject of a popular children's nursery rhyme in Mexico.

== Gallery ==
Making a molinillo in Oaxaca, Mexico

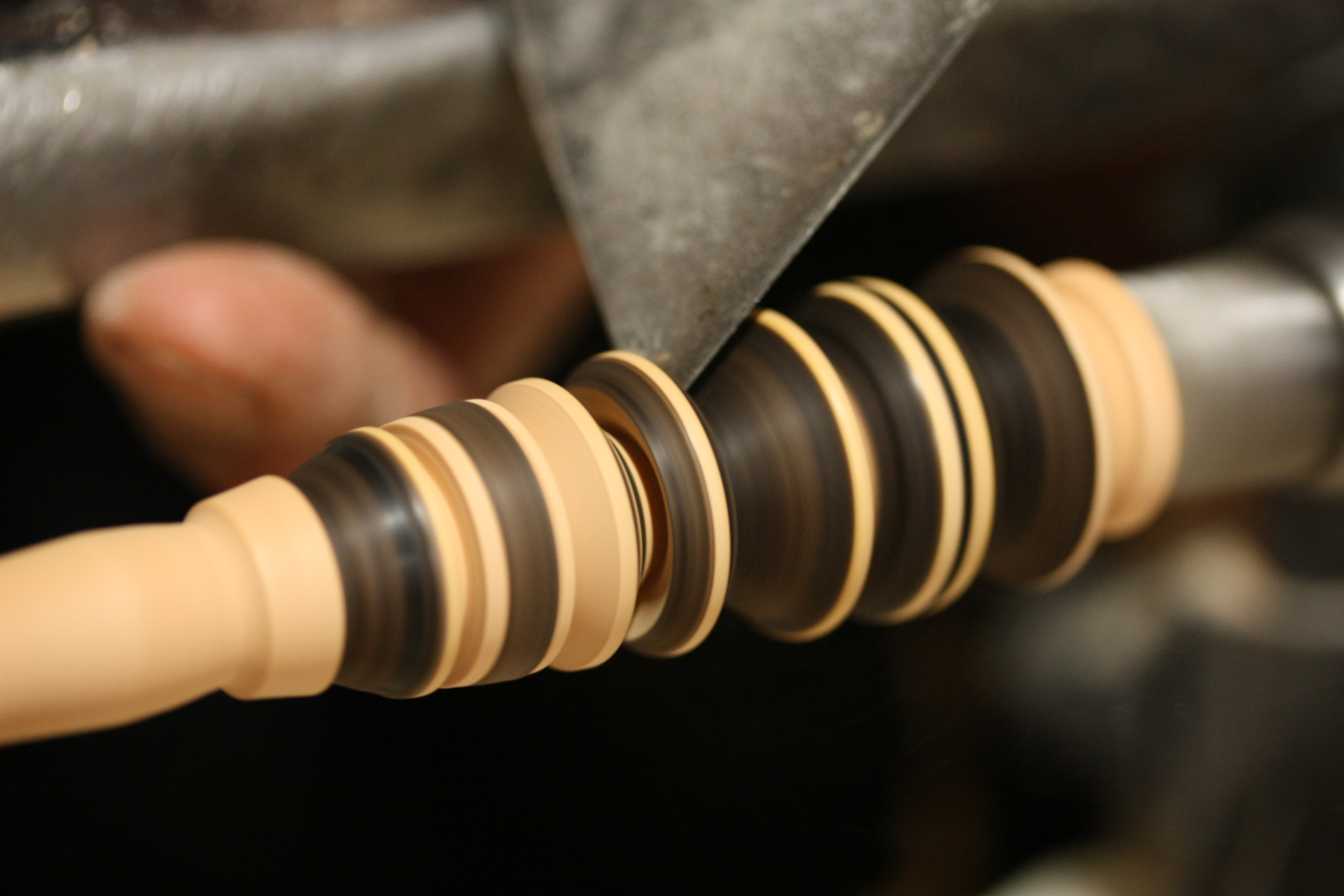
Artisan working a molinillo on a wood lathe

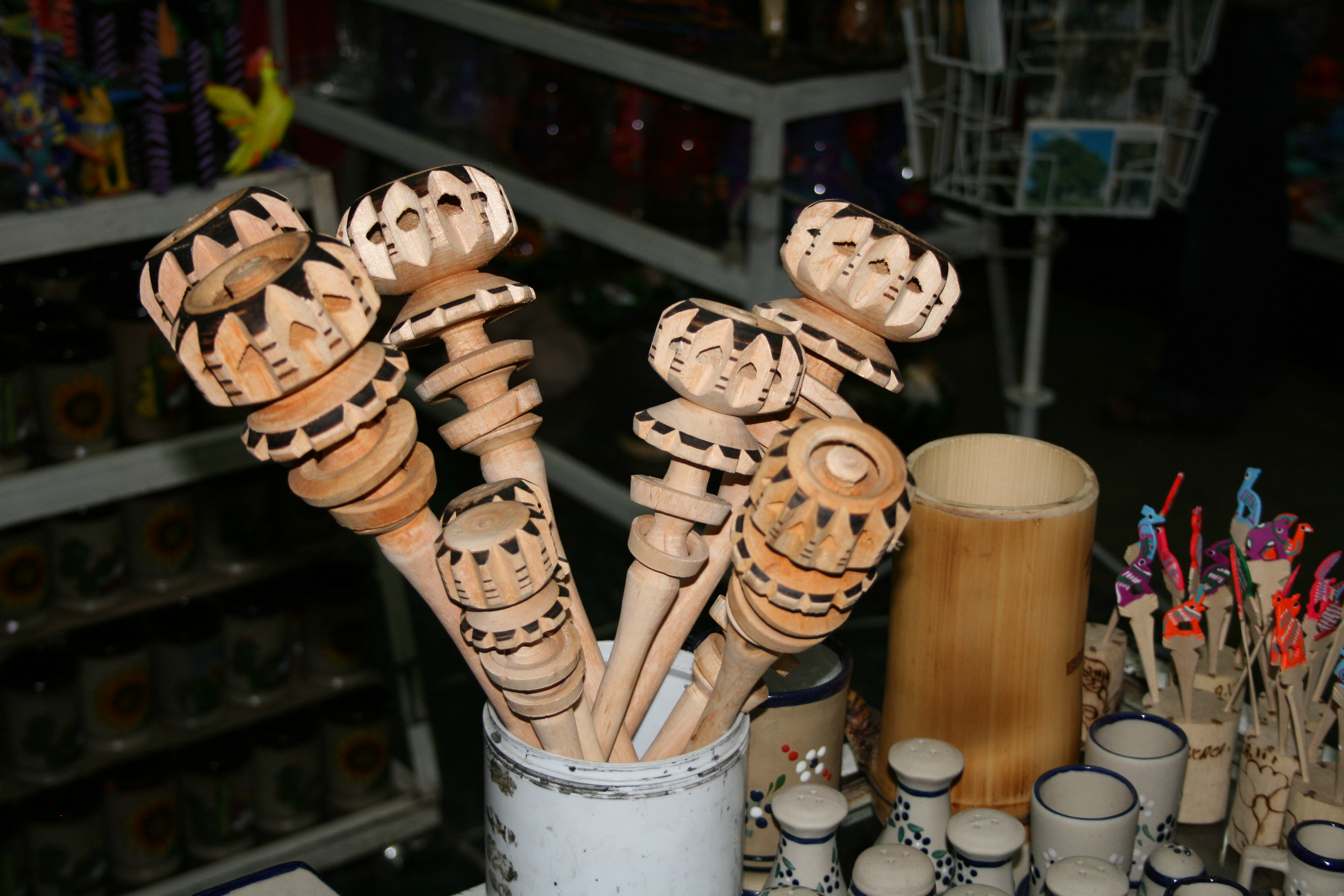
Molinillos for sale in Oaxaca

== See also ==
- Cacao beverage
