= Elizabeth P. Benson =

American art historian

Elizabeth Polk Benson (May 13, 1924 – March 19, 2018) was an American art historian, curator and scholar, known for her extensive contributions over a long career to the study of pre-Columbian art, in particular that of Mesoamerica and the Andes. A former "Andrew S. Keck Distinguished Visiting Professor of Art History" at the American University in Washington, D.C., Benson had also a long association with the Dumbarton Oaks Research Library and Collection, where she served both as director of Pre-Columbian studies and as curator of the institution's collection of Pre-Columbian artworks. Benson was born on May 13, 1924 and died in Washington D.C. on March 19, 2018 at the age of 93.

== Early life and education ==
Elizabeth Polk Benson, known as Betty, spent her childhood in Chevy Chase, Maryland, the daughter of Rebecca Dean Albin and Theodore B. Benson. She attended the National Cathedral School in Washington, D.C., where she was editor of the school literary magazine. Benson majored in English at Wellesley College, where she also studied Russian under Vladimir Nabokov. She completed an M.A. in art history and anthropology at the Catholic University of America, writing her master's thesis on the 16th century Italian painter Tintoretto.

== Career ==
After completing her undergraduate studies at Wellesley, Benson returned to Washington D.C. She was a painter as well as a writer, publishing works of poetry and detective fiction and exhibiting her paintings in local galleries. As a painter she specialized in landscapes though she also made abstract paintings and studied for one summer under the abstract painter Hans Hofmann. Her interest in art led her to a series of jobs at the National Gallery of Art, eventually landing in the position of Assistant Registrar in 1954. While at the National Gallery she became familiar with the Pre-Columbian art collection of Robert Woods Bliss, one of the founders of Dumbarton Oaks. Prior to the construction of the Pre-Columbian Pavilion at Dumbarton Oaks, Mr. Bliss loaned his collection for display at the Gallery and developed a personal working relationship with Benson when he would stop by to bring new objects to be shown. Benson recalled his visits in her oral history with Dumbarton Oaks, remarking that he would come to the Gallery "sometimes with a little object in his pocket, a piece of jade or something, and he would say, 'I want you to see my latest temptation,' or something like that." After working at the National Gallery she moved briefly to New York to once again focus on her career as a creative writer and painter. During this time, Robert Woods Bliss and Mildred Bliss were planning additions to Dumbarton Oaks which would include a new gallery space, designed by Philip Johnson, to house Mr. Bliss' collection of Pre-Columbian art. When the building was near completion, Mr. Bliss personally endorsed Benson to be the caretaker of the collection and to oversee the installation of the new gallery, noting in a letter to archaeologist Samuel Lothrop that Benson knew the collection "almost as well as I do!" Benson accepted the offer which began a career spanning two decades at Dumbarton Oaks, starting as Assistant Curator for the Pre-Columbian Collection in 1962 and moving to Curator in 1965, a position she held until 1980. From 1972 to 1978 she had a dual role as the institutions' first Director of Pre-Columbian Studies.

== Work at Dumbarton Oaks ==
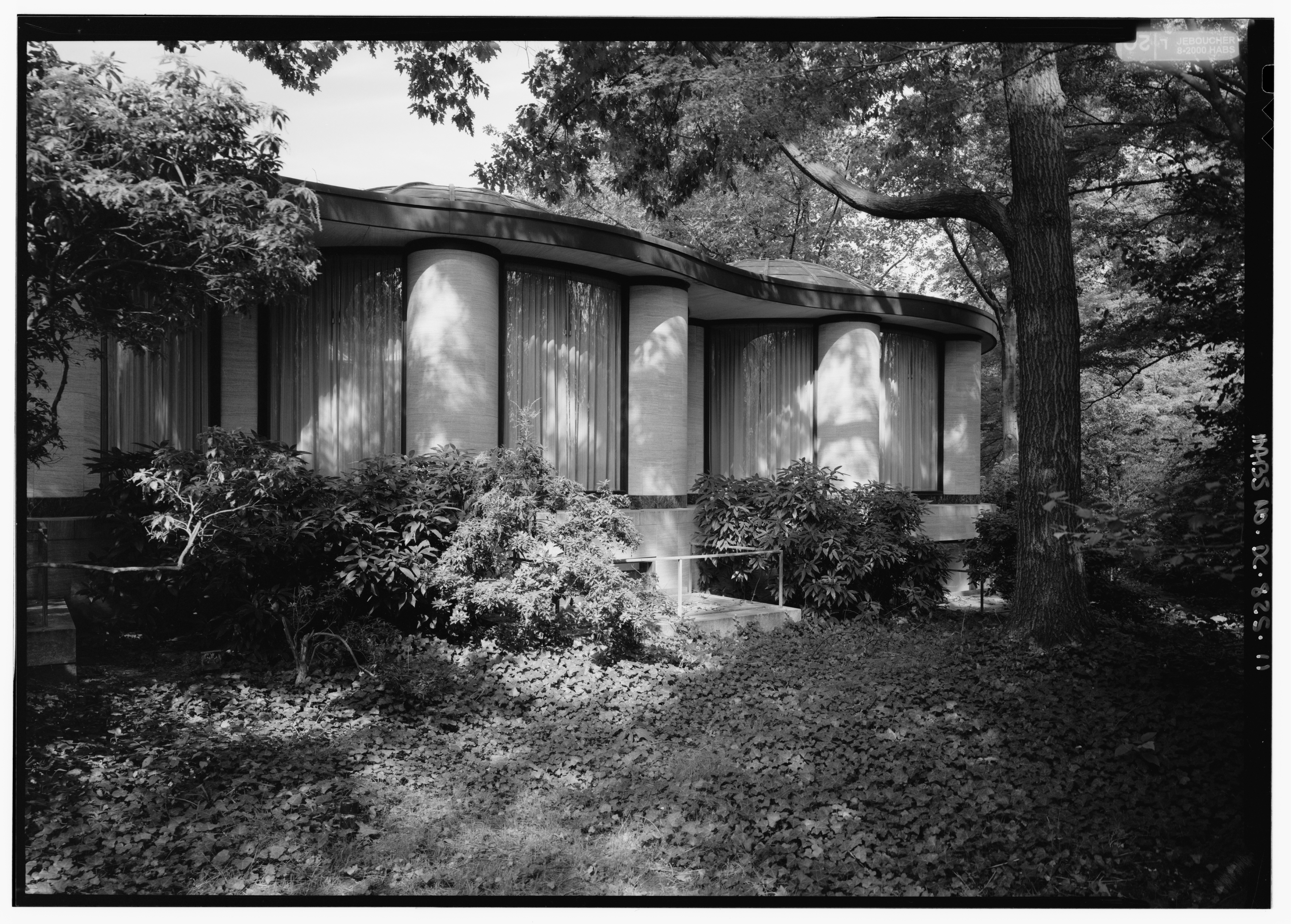
Exterior of the Pre-Columbian Pavilion at Dumbarton Oaks

Benson began the transition of the Bliss collection of Pre-Columbian objects by cataloging the items which were still housed at the National Gallery. She then worked closely with Dumbarton Oaks director John Thacher to decide the best way to display them in the newly designed modernist Pre-Columbian Pavilion. Consisting entirely of glass-walled round rooms, Benson recalled touring the new space and remarking to Thacher: "It's a beautiful building. How do you put anything in it?" Together with Thacher and James Mayo, a staff member at the Smithsonian, Benson devised a series of plexiglass cases that would display the objects as though they were floating in mid-air. In addition to her work stewarding the Pre-Columbian object collection, Benson was also a key figure in the establishment of a Pre-Columbian scholarly program of studies at Dumbarton Oaks. She invited Yale anthropology professor Michael Coe to give a public lecture which was subsequently published and became the inaugural volume in the series Dumbarton Oaks Studies in Pre-Columbian Art and Archaeology. She initiated the first Pre-Columbian Studies Symposium in 1967 on the subject of the Olmec, and served as organizer for 12 symposia in total through the 60s and 70s on topics ranging from writing systems to ritual sacrifice to metallurgy.

== Publications ==
Betty Benson published and edited many works over the course of her life, ranging from poetry to mysteries to scholarly publications, continuing to publish until she was well into her eighties. She wrote a series of mystery stories set in Maine which were published in Ellery Queen's Mystery Magazine and Alfred Hitchcock's Mystery Magazine. She did most of her mystery writing at a vacation home which she purchased in the 1960s in Sunset, Maine, and used the pseudonym Augusta Hancock as a nod to the state's capital. In the field of Pre-Columbian studies she wrote dozens of articles and several books on subjects such as the Bliss collection of Pre-Columbian art, animal themes in Andean and Mesoamerican iconography, and the Moche, an Andean culture of the 2nd-8th centuries CE. Her book The Mochica: A Culture of Peru was the first full-length monograph to be dedicated to the Moche.
