= David Grove =

American academic (1935–2023)

David C. Grove (October 17, 1935 – May 24, 2023) was an American anthropologist, archaeologist and academic, known for his contributions and research into the Preclassic (or Formative) period cultures of Mesoamerica, in particular those of the Mexican altiplano and Gulf Coast regions. A lecturer and professor at University of Illinois at Urbana-Champaign (UIUC) for some thirty years, Grove retained a position as Professor Emeritus of Anthropology at UIUC and was also designated a Courtesy Professor of Anthropology at the University of Florida.
