= Las Choapas (archaeological site) =

Archaeological site in Mexico

Las Choapas Archaeological Site
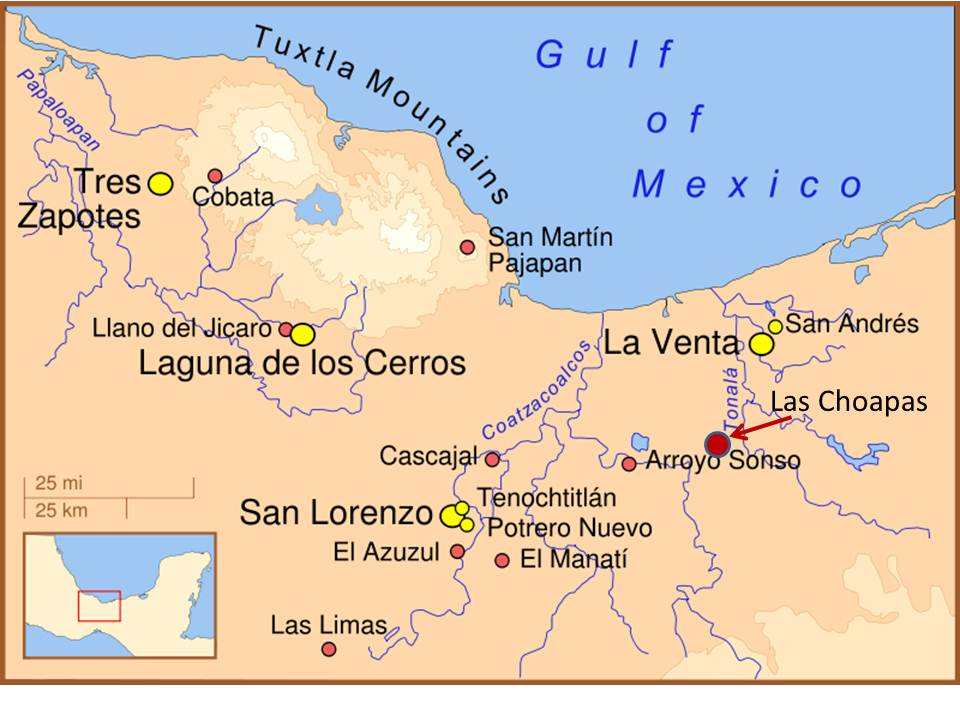
- Approximate location of Las Choapas, within the Olmec heartland, see the proximity to other important Olmec sites.
- Interactive map of Las Choapas Archaeological Site
- 17°55′00″N 94°06′00″W
- Type: Mesoamerican archaeology
- Periods: Mesoamerican Preclassical - Classical
- Cultures: Olmec – Epi-Olmec culture
- Location: Las Choapas, Veracruz; Mexico
- Region: Mesoamerica

Las Choapas is a recently found archaeological site located within the municipality of Las Choapas, in the southeastern border of the Veracruz State, inside the San Miguel de Allende Ejido, bordering the municipalities of Huimanguillo, Tabasco and Ostuacán, in Chiapas.

The site covers a known extension of about 60 Hectares and its actual location is being deliberately concealed to prevent the common looting. Access to the site by land takes about four hours as there are no roads, helicopter is the preferred means of transportation when archaeologists visit the site.

The culture that occupied this area is not clearly identified; however the site lies within the Olmec nuclear zone, sort of in between La Venta just 22.22 kilometers (13.81 mi) north in the neighboring state of Tabasco, and San Lorenzo Tenochtitlan some 62 kilometers (39 mi) to the west, both of which are important Olmec sites, but there are many smaller sites in surrounding areas, see the Olmec heartland map.

== Background ==
The prehispanic history of Veracruz is complex. It was inhabited primarily by four native cultures. The Huastecos and Otomis occupied the north, while the Totonacs resided in the north-center. The Olmecs, one of the oldest cultures in the Americas, became dominant in the southern part of Veracruz.

Remains of these past civilizations can be found in archeological sites such as Pánuco, Castillo de Teayo, El Zapotal, Las Higueras, Quiahuiztlán, El Tajín, Cempoala, Tres Zapotes and San Lorenzo Tenochtitlán.

The first major civilization in territory of the current state is that of the Olmecs, whose origin is unknown. Theories vary, including a fringe speculation which lacks scientific credibility in which Africans arrive in Campeche then northward to Veracruz over 3,500 years ago. The Olmecs settled in the Coatzacoalcos River region and it became the center of Olmec culture. The main ceremonial center here was San Lorenzo Tenochtitlán. Other major centers in the state include Tres Zapotes in the city of Veracruz and La Venta in Tabasco. The culture reached its height about 2600 years ago, with its best-known artistic expression being the colossal stone heads. These ceremonial sites were the most complex of that early time period. For this reason, many anthropologists consider the Olmec civilization to be the mother culture of the many Mesoamerican cultures that followed it. By 300 BCE, this culture was eclipsed by other emerging civilizations in Mesoamerica.

Another major group was the Totonacas, who have survived to the present day. Their region, called Totonacapan, is centered between the Cazones River and the Papaloapan River in the north of the state. Pre-Columbian Totonacas lived from hunting fishing and agriculture, mostly of corn, beans, chili peppers and squash. This is also the native region of the vanilla bean. Clay sculptures with smiling faces are indicative of this culture. The major site is El Tajin, located near Papantla, but the culture reached its apogee in Cempoala (about five miles (8 km) inland from the current port of Veracruz), when it was conquered by the Aztecs. When the Spaniards arrived in 1519, the territory was still home to a population of about 250,000 people living in fifty population centers and speaking four Totonac dialects. 25,000 were living in Cempoala alone.

The Huastecas are in the far north of the Veracruz and extend into parts of Tamaulipas, Hidalgo, San Luis Potosí, Querétaro and Puebla. The language and agricultural techniques of these people and the Maya are similar; however, only a few buildings and ceramics remain from the early Huasteca culture. This culture also reached its peak between 1200 and 1519, when it was conquered by the Spanish.

During the 15th and very early 16th century, the Aztecs came to dominate much of the state and dividing it into tributary provinces, of Tochtepec, Cuetlaxtlan, Cempoallan, Quauhtochco, Jalapa, Misantla, and Tlatlauhquitepec. The Aztecs were interested in the areas vegetation and crops such as cedars, fruit, cotton, cacao, corn, beans and vanilla. However, the Totonacs chafed under Aztec rule, with Aztec rulers from Axayacatl to Moctezuma II having to send soldiers to quell rebellions. The Huastecs were subjugated more successfully by the Aztecs and relegated to the provinces of Atlan and Tochpan.

Recent findings provide that Las Choapas could well be one of the most important ancient Zoque cities.

=== Zoque Culture ===
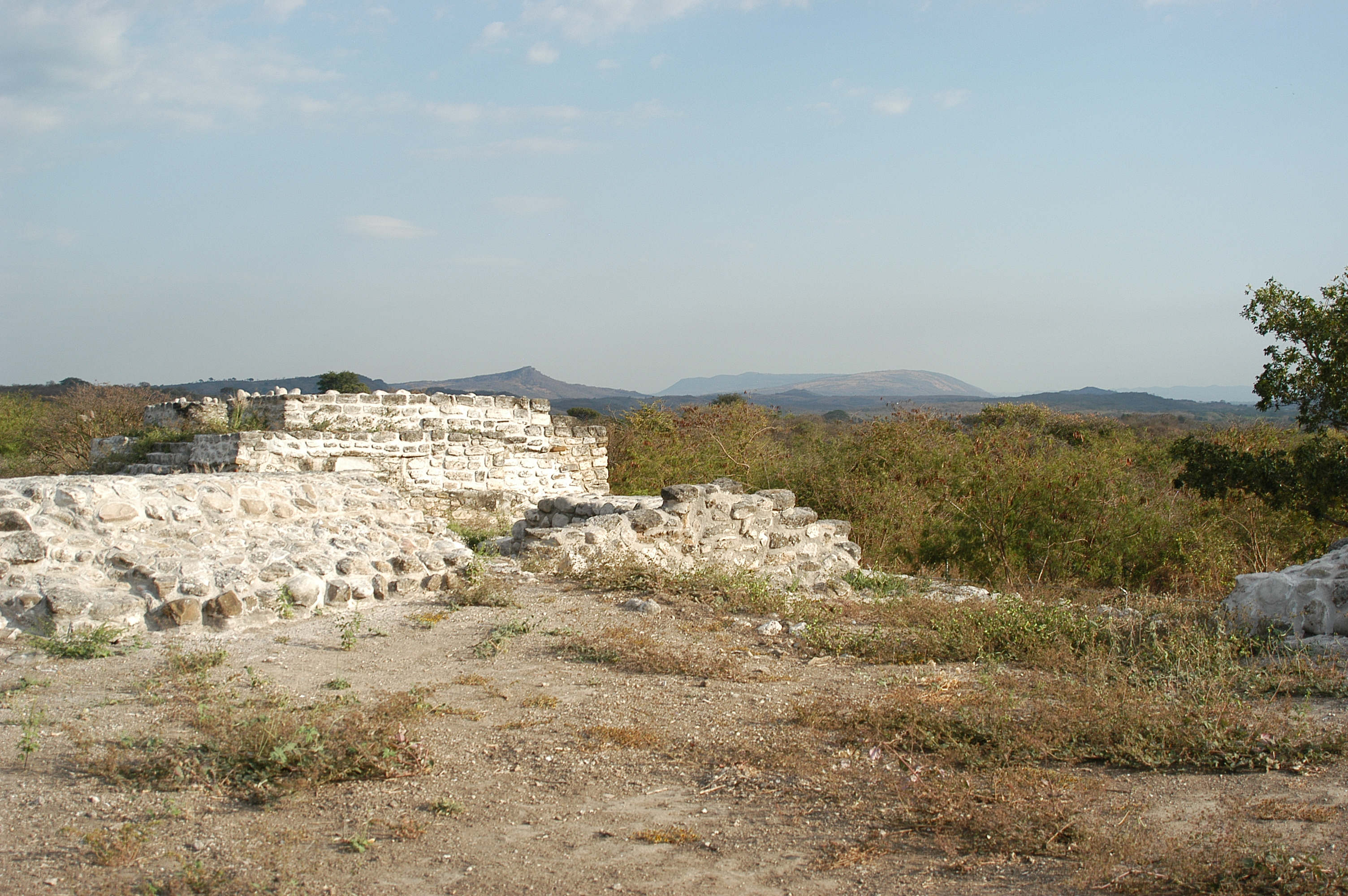
Mound 1, Chiapa de Corzo, view looking south toward the Grijalva River. (Photo courtesy of Bbachand)

The Zoque are a native people of Mexico; that speak variants of the Zoque languages.

The culture developed mainly in the northerly sector of Chiapas state, in the northern part of the Isthmus of Tehuantepec, in the state of Oaxaca, including the Selva Zoque and as far away as the Isthmus of Tehuantepec and parts of the state of Tabasco.Their language is also called Zoque, and has several branches and dialects. The Zoque are related to the Mixe.

They are believed to be descendants of the Olmec who migrated to Chiapas and Oaxaca. They had a good social and commercial relationship with the Mexica, which contributed to the economic prosperity of their culture in Chiapas.

On 17 May 2010 archaeologists in southern Mexico found a dignitary’s tomb inside a pyramid that may be the oldest type of burial discovered in Mesoamerica. The grave dates from about 2,700 years ago.

This tomb was built by the Zoque natives in Chiapa de Corzo, in southern Chiapas. It may be about 1,000 years older than the better-known pyramid tomb of the Mayan ruler Pakal at the Palenque archaeological site, also in Chiapas. Pre-Hispanic cultures built pyramids mainly as representations of the levels leading from the underworld to the sky.

=== Toponymy ===
The location original name was Achoapan, from the achiote word, river.

== The site ==
Ancient Mesoamerica News Updates 2008, No. 29 (April 5, 2008), reported on a recent discovery of a monolithic large size stone carving fragment. The stone depicted a skeletal personage, associated with a dot-and-bar numeral 7.

Currently available information associated with most sites found within the area (Ejido San Miguel de Allende) was initially placed chronologically to the preclassical mesoamerican period.

The site was originally wrongly reported with an association with the Maya, but as of April 4, 2008 the issue was clarified, relevant authorities confirmed that no excavation, exploration nor finding that would confirm the site as a Mayan city.

The initial belief of a Mayan city was due to the carved stone and the person depicted as well as the numeral inscriptions. These representations are not common of the Zoque region, as they are in the Maya region, where the character is known as “Vucub Came” and is a death related deity.

This, however, does not confirm the site as Mayan, as in fact there were cultural and social relations between this region and the Mayas. The region is part of what was believed to be a trade route between the south east and north-western region. This regions has Olmec and zoque cultural elements.

Vestiges found at Las Choapas suggest, from the orography and complex position can be archaeologically compared with the el zoque tradition, particularly with Malpasito, Tabasco.

A preliminary assessment of the features depicted by the monolithic sculpture can be related to other cultures, not necessarily the Maya. The main image consists of a stark skull, which was common in Mesoamerica in general. The face also has attributes such as ear decorations, and in the front an expanding scroll is depicted and emerges between nose and eyes, which can refer to the fire or breath.

At top the head, a vegetal element is depicted however it is not identified, possibly related to a city Toponymy. Also, in the back is a bar and two points, although it is not yet confirmed if it relates to numerals.

This type of carvings is not exclusive of the Maya area, because these have been found in other writing system (Epi-Olmec culture), which corresponds to this region of Veracruz. There are evidences of this cultural group using the point and the bar system, in monuments such as la Mojarra Stela, the Stela C from Tres Zapotes and the Tuxtla statuette, all of them in Veracruz.

The Epi-Olmec groups developed during the Protoclassical period, between 300BCE and roughly 250 CE. Epi-Olmecs were a successor culture to the Olmec, hence the prefix "epi-" or "post-". Although Epi-Olmec did not attain the far-reaching achievements of that earlier culture, it did realize, with its sophisticated calendrics and writing system, a level of cultural complexity unknown to the Olmecs.

=== Stone carving ===
The stone carving is apparently interpreted (read) from right to left, since the signs and other visual elements are to the right. The main sign represents a skull, possibly described as “anthropozoomorphic”. It depicts a de-fleshed jaw and an open eye, which departs from associations with other known mesoamerican deities. The deity is perceived as such by the presence of ear decorations. It also a ‘bracket’ element in the upper head not unlike those of some Maya signs such as T1016 (God C’s head) and sign SNA.

A ‘fire’ volute extends forward from the deity brow or nose. It can be compared with sign T122, although its shape is more symmetric. It could be said at this point that the motif of a ‘fire’ or ‘breath’-exhaling skull is not completely unknown within Maya iconography and writing. Some of its most common occurrences can be found as part of the Dedicatory Formula (PSS) on vessels represented by the sign T1049. However, there is not enough early classical period sculptural examples for a better comparison of the stone relief from Las Choapas.

The apparent ‘sprouting’ or ‘tufting’ vegetal motif a top of the head, perhaps reminiscent of semi-arid plants more common towards the Central Mexican plateau. It bears a certain resemblance with some early mesoamerican depictions of day-signs ‹REED› or ‹FLOWER› (see for example Xochicalco St. 1; Los Horcones St. 2). Almost touching the occipital region behind the head is an element which arguably could correspond to a bar-and-dot coefficient. If this is so, and Judging from the length of both the bar element and the relative spacing between the dot elements, the intended value could have been originally ‹EIGHT›, instead of ‹SEVEN›. Immediately behind this purported numeral, although unaligned with it or any of the other signs, another ‘scroll’ appears, only this time closely resembling the Maya sign T126.

The overall composition strongly gives the impression of being either:

1) A fully iconographic in nature, with no associations to a particular language or perhaps:

2) A particular toponym, anthroponym or theonym rendered through an ‘emblematic’ writing tradition, a trait that, despite being more common amongst central Mexican early-classical to late-postclassical civilizations, it was also readily adopted and/or emulated by some cultures that interacted with the former.

3) Less likely, it could also involve a compound where iconographic motifs were intertwined with glyphic signs (i.e. headdresses containing elements of glyphic proper names in Zapotec or Mayan traditions, etc.).

However, these are premature associations between the purported coefficient of ‹EIGHT› with the vegetal-like motif that might produce misleading calendric dates (i.e. ‹EIGHT-REED›), given that no clear reading order, alignment or indication exists between these two elements to suggest that they were intended to be read together.

=== Structures ===
The Las Choapas archaeological site has around 100 prehispanic structures, however these are superficial mounds and no exploration or excavation work is being performed, as is typical throughout the country.

At the site, many unexplored mounds can be seen, one such superficial mound has the shape of what could be a ballgame court.

== Other sites in Veracruz ==
- Castillo de Teayo
- El Manati
- La Venta
- San Lorenzo Tenochtitlán
- El Tajín
- Cempoala
- Tres Zapotes
- El Zapotal
- Las Higueras
- Quiahuiztlan
- Mesa de Cacahuatenco
- El Cuajilote
- Cuyuxquihui
- Cascajal Block
- Huatusco
- La Joya (archaeological site)
- Laguna de los Cerros
