= List of archaeological sites in Veracruz =

Below is a list of archaeological sites in the state of Veracruz, Mexico.

The Olmec heartland. The yellow dots represent ancient habitation sites, while the red dots represent isolated artifact finds unassociated with any ancient town or village.

Classic Era sites in western Mesoamerica.

- El Tajín
- La Conchita
- Santa Luisa
- El Manatí
- San Lorenzo Tenochtitlán
- Macayal
- Pánuco
- Laguna de los Cerros
- Arroyo Sonso
- Los Soldados
- Sayula
- Medias Aguas
- Estero Rabón
- Cruz del Milagro
- La Merced
- Las Limas
- Los Mangos
- Arroyo Pesquero
- El Viejón
- La Yerbabuena
- Chinameca
- Cerro de Las Mesas
- Loma del Zapote
- Estatuilla de Los Tuxtlas
- Tres Zapotes
- Alvarado
- Patarata Island
- Nopiloa
- El Zapotal
- Dicha Tuerta
- Remojadas
- Tlalixcoyan
- Los Cerros
- Jaina
- Matacapan
- Las Higueras
- Aparicio
- Xicalango-Potonchán-Jonuta
- Misantla
- Tlapacoyan
- Tlacolula
- Papantla
- Cempoala
- Isla de Sacrificios
- Palma Sola
- Vega de Alatorre
- Acayucan
- Villa Rica
- Quiahuiztlán
- Tabuco
- Tumilco
- Isla del Idolo
- El Aguila-Zacamixtle
- Organos
- Tepetzintla
- Yahualinca
- Mesa de Cacahuatenco

== Relevant sites in nearby states ==
A map of Formative Period sites in southeast Mesoamerica.

Tabasco

- La Venta
- Bari
- Jonuta
- Comalcalco
- Ahualulcos

Puebla

- Zacatlán
- Metlaltoyuca
- Xicotepec
- Cantona

Tamaulipas

- Las Flores

Others

- Izapa, Chiapas
- Kaminaljuyu, Guatemala
- Cotzulmahuapa, Guatemala
- Chalchuapa, El Salvador
