= La Joya (archaeological site) =

- Interactive map of La Joya
- 19.0283°N 96.1521°W
- Type: Mesoamerican archaeology
- Periods: Mesoamerican Preclassical, Classical
- Cultures: Olmec
- Location: Colima Municipality, Colima State, Mexico
- Region: Mesoamerica

La Joya is a Mesoamerican prehispanic archeological site, located in the municipality of Medellín in central Veracruz, Mexico, about 15 kilometers from the port of Veracruz, near the confluence of the Jamapa and Cotaxtla Rivers.

The site, discovered and registered in 1935, is known as "La Joya de San Martín Garabato" and comprises several earthen structures from an alleged early Olmec origin.

Remains of a continued human occupation throughout the classical period (200 BCE – 1000 CE) have been found), about 95% of the structures are destroyed by the common human carelessness and destruction.

This city probably was an important political center in Veracruz, similar to Cerro de las Mesas, with monumental stamped earthen architecture.

Two monumental platforms, apparently palatial residences, revealed a chronology during the first millennium CE, suggesting a well-organized society, providing new information on the Protoclassical (epi-Olmec) and Classical society.

== Background ==
The history of the native peoples of the state of Veracruz is complex. In the pre-Columbian period, the modern-day state of Veracruz was inhabited primarily by four indigenous cultures. The Huastecos and Otomis occupied the north, while the Totonacs resided in the north-center. The Olmecs, one of the oldest cultures in the Americas, became dominant in the southern part of Veracruz. Remains of these past civilizations can be found in archeological sites such as Pánuco, Castillo de Teayo, El Zapotal, Las Higueras, Quiahuiztlán, El Tajín, Cempoala, Tres Zapotes and San Lorenzo Tenochtitlán .

Chronology studies of archaeological sites in northern Veracruz show that the area has been occupied at least since 5600 B.C. and show how nomadic hunters and gatherers eventually became sedentary farmers, building more complex societies, even before the rise of the city of El Tajín.

The pace of this societal progression became more rapid with the rise of the neighboring Olmec civilization around 1150 B.C., although the Olmecs were never here in great numbers.

=== The Olmecs ===
The first major civilization in territory of the current state is that of the Olmecs, whose origin is unknown. Theories vary, including a fringe speculation which lacks scientific credibility in which Africans arrive in Campeche then northward to Veracruz over 3,500 years ago. The Olmecs settled in the Coatzacoalcos River region and it became the center of Olmec culture. The main ceremonial center here was San Lorenzo Tenochtitlán. Other major centers in the state include Tres Zapotes in the city of Veracruz and La Venta in Tabasco. The culture reached its height about 2600 years ago, with its best-known artistic expression being the colossal stone heads. These ceremonial sites were the most complex of that early time period. For this reason, many anthropologists consider the Olmec civilization to be the mother culture of the many Mesoamerican cultures that followed it. By 300 BCE, this culture was eclipsed by other emerging cultures in Mesoamerica.

The Olmec heartland where the Olmecs reigned from 1400 - 400 BCE.

The "Olmec heartland" is an area in the Gulf lowlands that is generally considered the birthplace of the Olmec culture. This area is characterized by swampy lowlands punctuated by low hills, ridges, and volcanoes. The Tuxtlas Mountains rise sharply in the north, along the Gulf of Mexico's Bay of Campeche. Here the Olmecs constructed permanent city-temple complexes at San Lorenzo Tenochtitlán, La Venta, Tres Zapotes, and Laguna de los Cerros. In this region, the Mesoamerican civilization would emerge and reign from c.1400–400 BCE.

=== Origins ===
What we today call Olmec first appears within the city of San Lorenzo Tenochtitlán, where distinctive Olmec features appear around 1400 BCE. Although Olmec civilization traces have been found all around Mesoamerica and it is considered that the Olmecs were a main influence on all regional civilizations.

The rise of civilization here was assisted by the local ecology of well-watered alluvial soil, as well as by the transportation network that the Coatzacoalcos River basin provided. This environment may be compared to that of other ancient centers of civilization: the Nile, Indus, and Yellow River valleys, and Mesopotamia. This highly productive environment encouraged a densely concentrated population which in turn triggered the rise of an elite class. It was this elite class that provided the social basis for the production of the symbolic and sophisticated luxury artifacts that define Olmec culture. Many of these luxury artifacts, such as jade, obsidian and magnetite, came from distant locations and suggest that early Olmec elites had access to an extensive trading network in Mesoamerica. The source of the most valued jade, for example, is found in the Motagua River valley in eastern Guatemala, and Olmec obsidian has been traced to sources in the Guatemala highlands, such as El Chayal and San Martín Jilotepeque, or in Puebla, distances ranging from 200 to 400 km away (120 – 250 miles away) respectively.

== Site ==
Site studies have been conducted since about 2004 to establish a more accurate chronological setting of the site, as well as its function and purpose of the structures.

For many years, the existence of thousands of sites is known, distributed across the Veracruz coastal plains, from the Antigua River down to the Coatzacoalcos and Grijalva Rivers, and even down to Campeche; although this type of construction is part of a little known tradition.

Therefore, these findings are unique, there is no information about earthen structures construction techniques in Central Veracruz.

== Structures ==
Extensive stratigraphic excavations results provide that, although the platforms existed from the late preclassical period, during the early classical the main plaza had been constructed, bordered by the pyramid and the monumental north and east platforms, that had palaces probably with administrative, ritual and residential functions.

Ongoing exploration shows a complex building sequence, with evidence of refined architecture, and human burials with ceramic vessels and figurines offerings.

Excavations are only being conducted on the Pyramid, North Platform and East Platform.

=== Main Pyramid ===
The pyramid construction probably commenced in the early classical period (100 BCE–300CE), based on ceramic evidence comparison with findings on the second stage of the North Platform. The three structures have a chronology spanning the first CE millennium.

The structure was 26 m high, and at least had two building stages, from ceramic remains dated between 100BCE–300CE, early classical and 800–1000 CE, late classical.

The pyramid, in 1999 was still a 22 m high structure, with 32 degree angle slopes, indicating the use of some technology to control structural pressures of the earthen fill.

The excavations show that the solution to this problem was alternating fill blocks (approximately 1 m high and more than 6 m on the side) made from clays and sandy loams, readily available in the site surrounding areas. The clay blocks due to their cohesiveness, would form buttresses containing the blocks of sandy loam. Inversely, the sandy loam blocks had better compaction, therefore providing a more stable surface.

The building had access stairways from the plaza level, the staircase had containment walls with sloping sides.

=== Ballgame Court ===
It is located to the south of the main plaza.

=== North-east Platform ===
No details or information is available.

=== North Platform ===
This platform contains five buildings, from the second constructive stage; these were part of one of the palaces and probably were used for administrative purposes, with restricted access, with some residential and ceremonial areas.

=== East Platform ===
Located on the east side of the plaza, were the other palace was possibly erected, at about the same time as the other. Many ceramic figures of “nosed” characters have been found, these were not found on the northern palace.

Two structures surround the east plaza; these are believed to have been elite residences (palaces), suggesting an organized type of government, at least by 100BCE–100CE, providing new information on the late preclassical (epi-Olmec) and classical period society.

== Burials ==
A series of paleosoil samples containing organic matter was found below the structures, possibly part of offerings.

The excavations revealed the existence burials containing offerings in all platforms, the burials contained human remains, ceramic vessels and figurines.

The earliest burial was found at the center of the pyramid, apparently deposited on top of paleosoil immediately before the construction. The ceremonial burials seems to have involved the burning of organic material, large patches of carbonized organic matter were located immediately on top of the paleosoil, below the sand fill of the structure.

Other deposits were found in a roughly symmetrical pattern along the central east-west axis. There are two deposits of human bones and a skull covered by a bowl, a complete vessel buried upside down, and lenticular patches of carboniferous earth.

== Bibliography ==
- 2002, División de Posgrado de la Facultad de Filosofía y Letras e Instituto de Investigaciones Antropológicas, Universidad Nacional Autónoma de México. Classical period settlement patterns of the Cotaxtla River lower basin, central Veracruz. Case study of complex society’s development in lower tropical lands.
- Annick Daneels, 2008, Project Grant Report. La Joya pyramid, Central Veracruz, Mexico: Classic Period Earthen Architecture
- Philip J. Arnold III and Christopher A. Pool: 197–223. Dumbarton Oaks Research Library and Collections. Harvard University. Ballcourts and Politics in the Lower Cotaxtla Valley: A Model to Understand Classic Central Veracruz. Classic-Period Cultural Currents in Southern and Central Veracruz, edited by Press, Washington D.C. ISBN 978-0-88402-350-0
