= The Wrestler (sculpture) =

Olmec sculpture

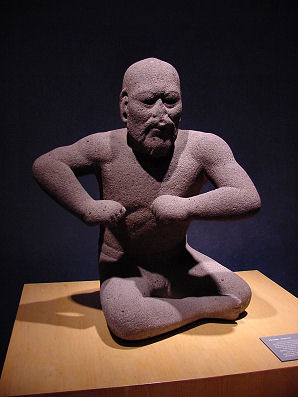
The Wrestler is an Olmec basalt statuette, likely a personal portrait.

The Wrestler is a basalt statuette dating to between 1500 BCE and 400 BCE, which some believe to be one of the most important sculptures of the Olmec culture. The near-life-size figure has been praised not only for its realism and sense of energy, but also for its aesthetic qualities. Since 1964, the sculpture has been part of the collection of the Museo Nacional de Antropología in Mexico City.

This 66-centimetre (26 in)-high Mesoamerican statuette was discovered in 1933 by a farmer in Arroyo Sonso, in the Mexican state of Veracruz near the Rio Uxpanapa and not far from its confluence with the Coatzacoalcos River, an area now known as Antonio Plaza.

It is considered unlikely that this sculpture, also known formally as Antonio Plaza Monument 1 as well as El Luchador Olmeca (Spanish, "the Olmec wrestler") actually represents a wrestler.

== Description ==
The statuette shows a seated male figure. The legs are delicate and rather diminutive, with the right leg bent in front of the body and the left folded backward, almost underneath the body. The arms are upraised and, similar to the legs, bent and asymmetrical. Both hands are clenched. In a position unusual for Olmec art, the shoulders are not situated directly above the hips, but twisted slightly to the right, giving the sculpture a sense of movement that is accentuated by the well-defined muscles and the dynamic positioning of the arms.

The head is bald, but it lacks the highly stylized cranial deformation found in many Olmec figurines or the wooden busts of El Manati. The figure wears a mustache and goatee, relatively rare features in Olmec sculpture which appear on only a few reliefs such as La Venta Monument 3.

The figure wears only a lightly outlined loincloth, leading to the supposition that the statuette originally was dressed in ritualistic clothing that has perished with the passage of time.

This sculpture is fully three-dimensional and presumed to be intended for viewing from all sides: the rear view shows carefully sculpted shoulder blades and a slight naturalistic bulge that is visible above the belt at the hips. Mary Ellen Miller finds that "the long diagonal of line of the figure's back and shoulders is as beautiful and commanding as the frontal view". The figure clearly is more free-flowing than other three-dimensional Olmec sculptures (than, for example, San Martin Pajapan Monument 1), which frequently are boxy and seemingly "confined" by the medium from which they are carved.

== Subject and dating ==
The Wrestler was discovered in 1933 at Arroyo Sonso, almost halfway between the major Olmec centers of San Lorenzo Tenochtitlan and La Venta, in the middle of the Olmec heartland.

Despite its name, it is unlikely that the figure represents a wrestler and it is thought that the mustache and goatee connect the subject to the "political-religious hierarchy". Based on similarities with Jacques le Moyne's painting of a 16th-century Timucua ritual, art historian Roy Craven suggests that the figure is that of a shaman, although this proposal has received little notice. Based on the individuality of the piece as well as the detail inherent in the face, it is thought that the sculpture is a portrait.

Being a work of stone without archaeological context, it has been difficult to date the sculpture. While some researchers consider it an early work, dated as early as 1200 BCE, others consign it to a period closer to 400 BCE, near the end of the Olmec culture. This dating is based largely on its dissimilarities to earlier formalistic Olmec sculptures. Michael Coe simply assigns it to the period between 1500 BCE and 400 BCE.

== Authenticity debate ==
The sculpture falls outside the norms for much of the known Olmec art:

- The sculpture has no overt iconography, in contrast for example to Las Limas Monument 1.
- Whereas seated Olmec figures almost invariably have a broad base, this figure's base is narrow in proportion to its torso.
- The rotation of the upper body is unique in surviving Olmec sculptures, as is its "sensitive detail" such as the foot, complete with arch and rounded toes.
- In their petrographic analysis of Olmec artifacts, Williams and Heizer found that the basalt "is distinctive and . . . no other monument seen by us in Veracruz or Tabasco is made of the same material." They speculate that "it may be an imported piece . . . and its non-local origin is also suggested by the remarkable realism which is displayed".

The art historian Nancy Kelker of Middle Tennessee State University argues that a vague provenance, atypical stone, unusual carving of the back, nonstandard posture, recent publication of scholarly material on Olmec jades, and an urgent interest among Mexicans to find a myth for their origin in antiquity all suggest that it is a modern sculpture. In response to these arguments, the archaeologist Michael Coe and art historian Mary Miller, both of Yale University, defended the sculpture as authentic, arguing that its similarity to Monument 34 from the Olmec site San Lorenzo, and the fact that we know little about Olmec art make it probable that this is an Olmec masterpiece from antiquity. At a separate time Coe stated that if Heizer felt the sculpture was a fake based on the petrographic analysis, then "something must be wrong with the petrographic analysis!". Susan Milbrath also argues against the possibility of a forgery. Milbrath maintains that its 1933 discovery, well before archaeologists defined Olmec culture or excavated Olmec sites, precludes falsification. She suggests that the Wrestler represents "a little known aspect of Olmec monumental art".

== Appraisals ==
Superlatives abound in descriptions of this sculpture by archaeologists and art historians alike. Richard Diehl says it is the "most spectacular" Olmec three-dimensional sculpture while Hugh Honour finds it "the finest of all Olmec sculptures". For Ignacio Bernal it is "one of the greatest of Olmec works of art", a thought later echoed by Michael Coe who says it is "one of the supreme examples of Olmec art" with a "feeling for individual character and for human physique [which] could only come from long study of anatomy".

Comparing it to other pre-Columbian art, archaeologist Mary Ellen Miller describes the Wrestler as "among the most powerful three-dimensional portraits of the ancient New World".

Art historian George Kubler discerns few rivals anywhere, stating that "the spiraling motion of the body, the multiplicity of profile, the coherent muscles, and the expressive restraint of the work set it apart as among the great works of sculpture of all ages". In 1996, the government of the United Mexican States issued a one-ounce silver coin bearing the image of the sculpture on its obverse, one of six in the Olmec cultural set.
