= Soldado =

Soldado is a Spanish and Portuguese word meaning soldier. It may refer to:

== Arts and media ==
- El Soldado, a 1634 play by Luis Quiñones de Benavente
- El Soldado, an 1892 play by Adolfo León Gómez
- "El Soldado", a song recorded by Barbarito Díez
- "Soldados", a 1985 song recorded by Legião Urbana
- 'El Soldado', an Argentine band featuring Skay Beilinson
- Los Soldados, a 2013 novel by Pablo Aranda
- Sicario: Day of the Soldado, a 2018 film, sequel to the 2015 film Sicario

== Places ==
- Soldado Rock, a small island in Trinidad and Tobago
- Los Soldados, an archaeological site in Veracruz

== Other uses ==
- Soldado (surname)

== See also ==
- Nibea soldado (N. soldado), the soldier croaker, a fish
