= Choapa =

Choapa may refer to

- Choapa River, a river of Chile located in the Coquimbo Region.
- Choapa Province, one of the provinces making up the Coquimbo Region of Chile.

== See also ==
- Las Choapas, Veracruz
- Las Choapas (archaeological site)
