= Mesa de Cacahuatenco =

Archaeological site

- Interactive map of Mesa de Cacahuatenco
- 20°41′N 98°01′W
- Type: Mesoamerican archaeology
- Periods: Mesoamerican Postclassical
- Cultures: Totonac – Huastec – Otomi
- Location: Ixhuatlán de Madero, Veracruz; Mexico
- Region: Mesoamerica

History
- Built: 900 to 1500 CE

Mesa de Cacahuatenco is a Mesoamerican pre-Columbian archeological site, located in the municipality of Ixhuatlán de Madero in northern Veracruz, Mexico, south of the Vinasca River.

It is an important site, located some 44 kilometers (27.32 mi.) west of Castillo de Teayo another contemporary archaeological site in Veracruz.

El Tajín archaeological site is located some 80 kilometers (49 mi.) southeast. It is one of the largest and better known cities of the mesoamerican classical era, it flourished from 600 to 1200 C.E.

== Toponymy ==
The word Ixhuatlán is derived from two Náhuatl words: Ixhuatl that means “papatla” and Tlan that means place.

Hence, Ixhuatlán means “Place of papatlas”; papatla is a plant that frows in moist places and its leaves are used to wrap tamales.

== Background ==
The history of the native peoples of the state of Veracruz is complex. In the pre-Columbian period, the modern-day state of Veracruz was inhabited primarily by four indigenous cultures. The Huastecos and Otomis occupied the north, while the Totonacs resided in the north-center. The Olmecs, one of the oldest cultures in the Americas, became dominant in the southern part of Veracruz. Remains of these past civilizations can be found in archeological sites such as Pánuco, Castillo de Teayo, El Zapotal, Las Higueras, Quiahuiztlán, El Tajín, Cempoala, Tres Zapotes and San Lorenzo Tenochtitlán . Chronology studies of archaeological sites in northern Veracruz show that the area has been occupied at least since 5600 B.C. and show how nomadic hunters and gatherers eventually became sedentary farmers, building more complex societies, even before the rise of the city of El Tajín.

The pace of this societal progression became more rapid with the rise of the neighboring Olmec civilization around 1150 B.C., although the Olmecs were never here in great numbers.

It is unclear who built these cities. Some argue in favor of the Totonacs and the Xapaneca; however, there is a significant amount of evidence that the area was populated by the Huastec at the time some of these settlements were founded. In the 1st century C.E.

In the case of El Tajin, construction started soon after and by 600 C.E., it was a city. Its rapid rise was due to its strategic position along the old Mesoamerican trade routes. It controlled the flow of commodities, both exports such as vanilla and imports from other locations in what is now Mexico and Central America. From the early centuries, objects from Teotihuacan are abundant.

These sites combine various cultural traditions, first the Olmec, considered the mother civilization and subsequently several cultural expressions, in different times, ranging from the Huastec, Totonac, Otomi, and the Aztec, in the late Postclassical. According to specialists, the architecture of the only remaining building is of Aztec filiation, although the village also had relationships with Toltec groups from the Mexican Plateau.

The Olmec-vixtoti Culture became the cuexteca or Huastec culture. In relation to the Maya and Toltec societies, there was an important influence on the site sculptures. However, there is another version that says that the sculptural style corresponds to a Toltec occupation.

The Huastec culture developed south of the current states of Tamaulipas, north of Veracruz, east of San Luis Potosí and small areas of the states of Puebla, Querétaro and Hidalgo. Although this geographic-cultural regionalization has not been stable thru time, Teayo Castle is included in this region.

== Site ==
Mesa de Cacahuatenco was probably a very important ceremonial center. It occupies an extension of over 75 hectares with more than 60 covered structures identified, the site is probably twice as large as El Tajin.

A remarkable feature of this site is represented by a hydraulic system that apparently interconnected the structures of the city. Current studies chronologically place this site at about 900 to 1500 CE.

Although little information is known about its founders, current information identify this recently discovered site as one of the most important in the Huasteca region.

Excavations have barely commenced, yet the site complex architectonic features are remarkable.

== Structures ==
Of the more of 60 buildings, the largest structure is a platform measuring 50 meters long by 28 wide; the structures comprise a cannel system, residential structures, 18 buildings within the central plaza.

The site also includes a ballgame court, although there are no details of its characteristics.

=== Hydraulic and road system ===
The site has an hydraulic system, unlike any other archaeological site found thus far, it is made from communicating channels and a road complex, of Mayan style.

== Bibliography ==
- James Olson, ed. Historical Dictionary of the Spanish Empire, 1402-1975, 1992.
- I. Bernal and E. Dávalos, Huastecos y Totonacos, 1953.
- H.R. Harvey and Isabel Kelly, "The Totonac," in Handbook of Middle American Indians, 1969.
- Isabel Kelly and Ángel Palerm, The Tajín Totonac, 1952.
- Ichon, A. : La religión de los totonacas de la sierra. México : Instituto Nacional Indigenista, 1973.
- Wright Carr, David Charles (2005). "Precisiones sobre el término "otomí"" (PDF). Arqueología Mexicana (in Spanish). XIII (73): 19. Archived from the original (PDF) on November 8, 2005.
- Manuscritos Otomies del Virreinato - Paper in Spanish by David Wright Carr
- Otomies en las fuentes - Paper in Spanish by David Wright Carr
- Lengua cultura e historia de los Otomíes Paper in Spanish by David Wright Carr
