= El Azuzul =

Archeological site in Mexico

Coordinates: 17.7122°N 94.7492°W

The Olmec heartland, showing the location of El Azuzul in relation to San Lorenzo and other Olmec sites.

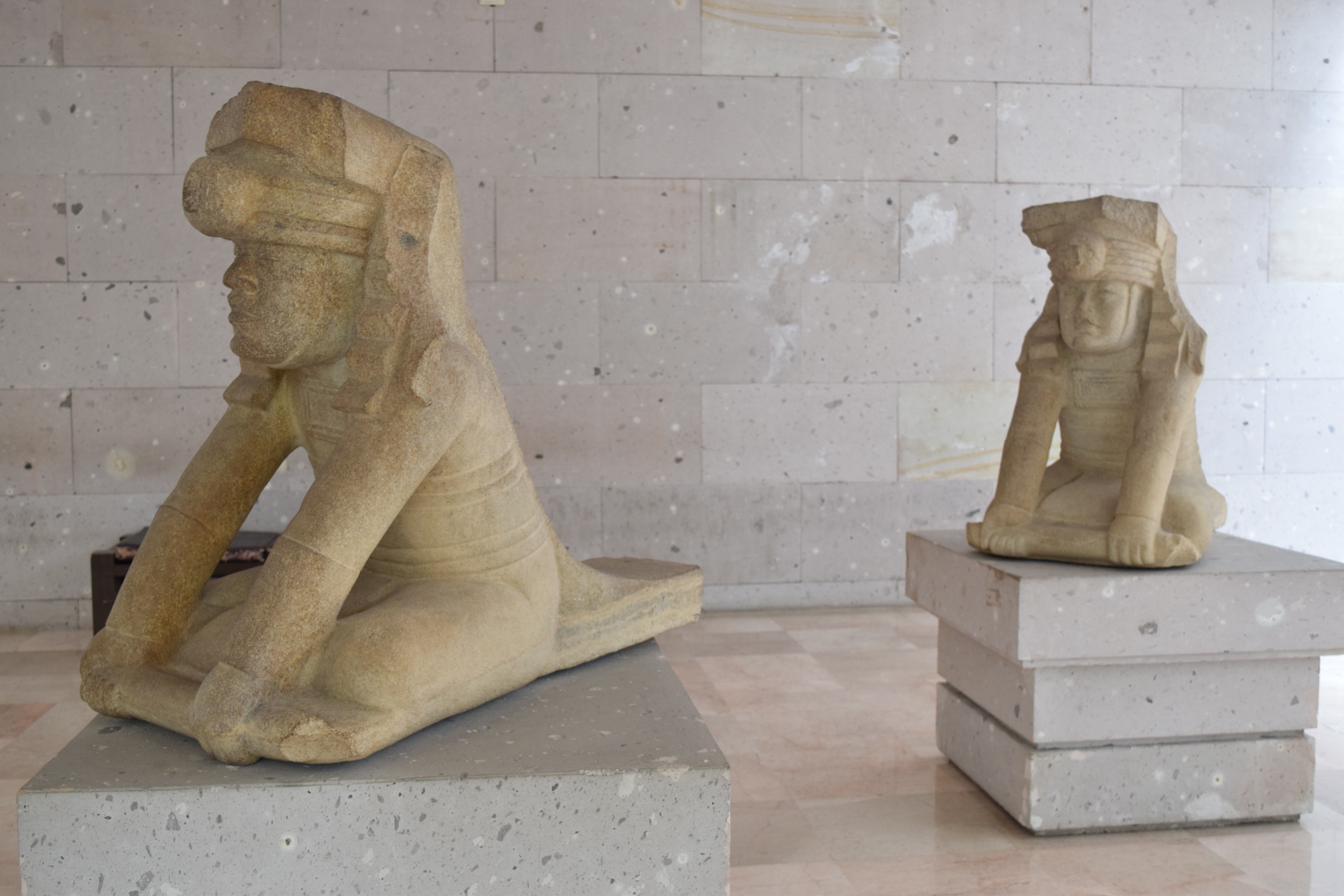
The "twins" at El Azuzul.

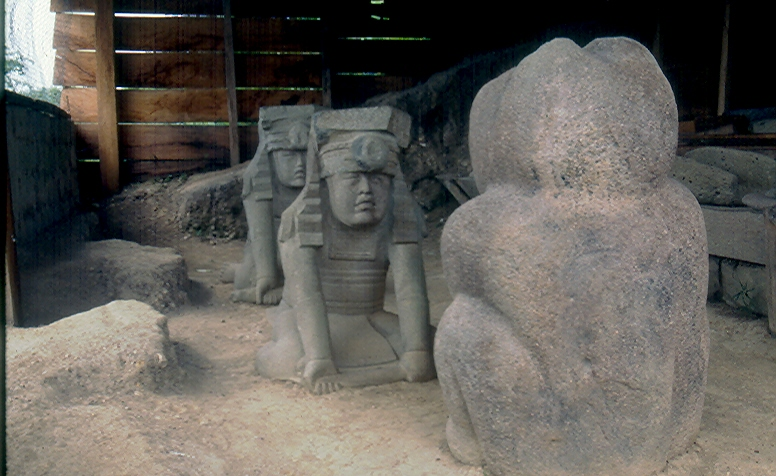
A photo of the sculptures in situ, as they were discovered, with the "twins" facing off against the jaguar. The sculptures have since been moved to Xalapa.

El Azuzul is an Olmec archaeological site in Veracruz, Mexico, a few kilometers south of the San Lorenzo Tenochtitlán complex and generally considered contemporary with it (perhaps 1100 to 800 BCE). Named for the ranch on which it is located, El Azuzul is part of the Loma del Zapote complex. The site occupies the higher elevations north of the confluence of two ancient river courses, a part of the Coatzacoalcos River system. It is upstream of the monumental earthworks at Potrero Nuevo, which is part of the San Lorenzo complex.

== Monumental art ==
El Azuzul is best known for two pairs of monumental sculptures, now on exhibit at the Xalapa Museum of Anthropology, Xalapa, Mexico. These statues were found on the south side of the large pyramid/hill on the site, intact and apparently undisturbed since they were placed there in Pre-Classic times.

The first pair of statues, described as "some of the greatest masterpieces of Olmec art", are nearly identical seated human figures. When discovered the two statues were facing east, one behind the other (see bottom photo). Some researchers have suggested that these "twins" are forerunners of the Maya Hero Twins from the Popul Vuh, although their headdresses have led others to describe them as priests. The twins' headdresses have been mutilated, probably to erase identifying insignia.

Each twin, like the figure in San Martín Pajapan Monument 1, is grasping a ceremonial bar with his right hand under the bar and his left over, caught in the act of raising what has been described as an axis mundi or Mesoamerican world tree.

Facing these two humans was a feline-like statue, generally identified as a jaguar. Slightly larger than the humans it faced, the feline is roughly 1.2 meters high. A 1.6 meter version of this feline was found a few meters away, to the northeast. The jaguars show evidence of having been recarved from earlier monuments.

The humans are similar to other Olmec sculpture, in particular San Martin Pajapan Monument 1, where a young lord also attempts to lift a ceremonial bar. Despite its "tantalizing hints of [a] lost mythic cycle", it is not known with any clarity what this four statue tableau illustrates.

== Structures ==
In addition to the large pyramid/hill, a long causeway or dike was constructed along the waterway, possibly functioning as a levee and/or wharf. El Azuzul also contains other possible structures, now completely overgrown.
