= El Zapotal =

Pre-Columbian ceremonial site in central Veracruz, Mexico

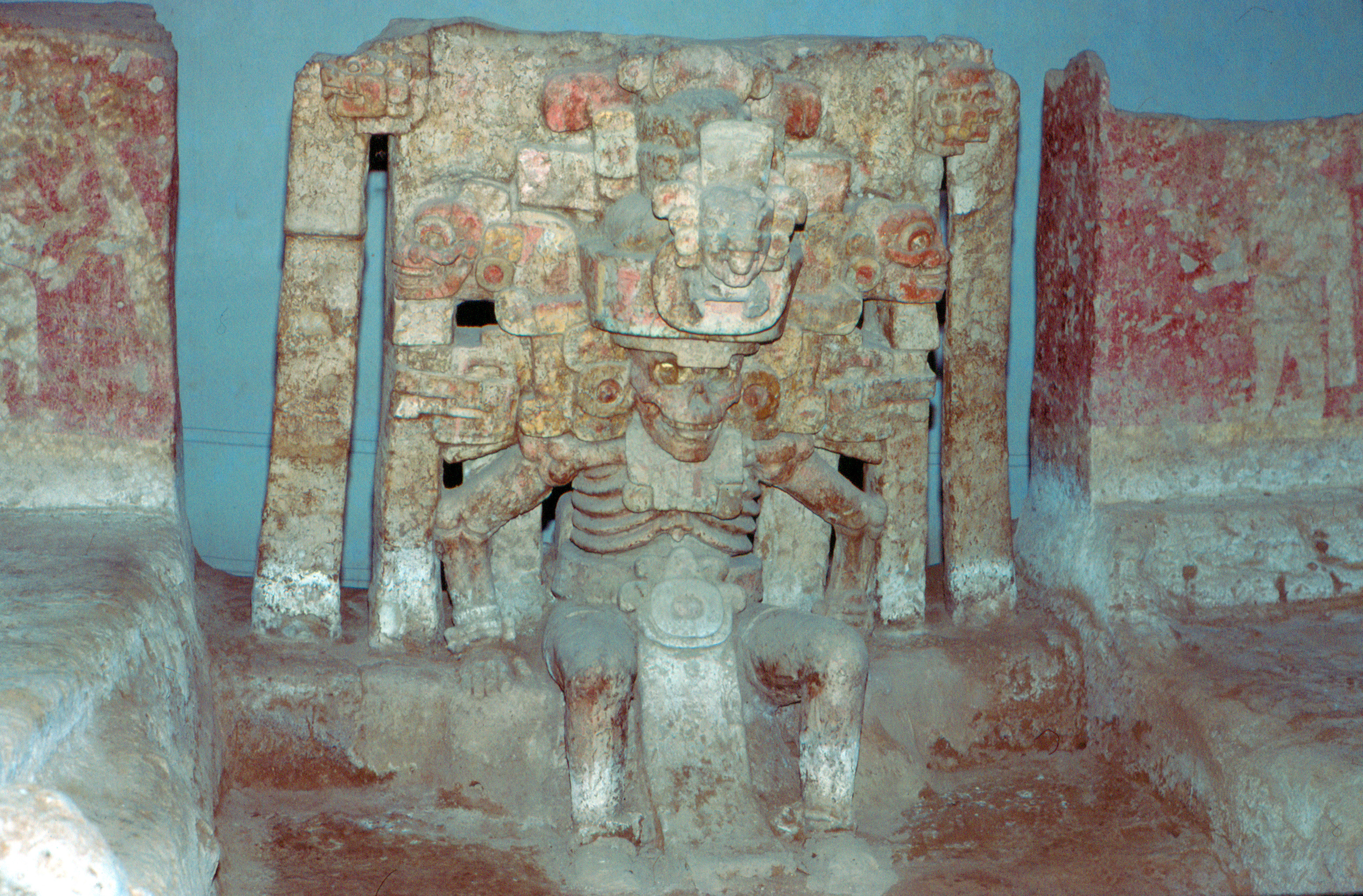
- Sculpture of Mictlantecuhtli
- Interactive map of El Zapotal
- 21°36′40″N 98°23′12″W
- Type: Mesoamerican archaeology
- Periods: Mesoamerican Classical and Postclassical
- Cultures: Totonac
- Location: Ignacio de la Llave Municipality, Veracruz, Mexico
- Region: Mesoamerica

History
- Built: 600–900 CE

El Zapotal is a Totonac archaeological site located in the Ignacio de la Llave Municipality in Veracruz, Mexico. It contains the ruins of a Totonac city that flourished from 600 to 900 CE, during what archaeologists call the Classical Period.

== Discovery ==
The site of El Zapotal was discovered in 1971 when several human burials with offerings of clay sculptures were found. The sculptures included a group of women with naked torsos, identified as representations of Cihuatéotl, the lady of the land; these representations are now exhibited in the Xalapa Museum of Anthropology.

== Site ==
El Zapotal is a significant Totonac site whose apogee seems to have occurred at the end of the Late Classical Period and the beginning of the Early Postclassical period. Although it contains many buildings, only a few have been explored.

=== Mictlantecuhtli shrine ===
One notable sculpture, made from painted, unbaked clay, is an image of Mictlantecuhtli, the Death God, represented as an emaciated person. The sculpture sits on an elaborate throne, and the backrest is integrated into the huge headdress worn by the deity, with human skulls in profile and the heads of \ Because of its fragility, the sculpture was kept on site, and a museum was founded there.

== See also ==
Other archaeological sites in Veracruz:

- El Tajín (300–1200)
- Papantla (900–1519)
- Cempoala (900–1519)
- Cuyuxquihui
- Castillo de Teayo
- El Cuajilote
- El Manatí
