= Olmec alternative origin speculations =

Hypotheses on the origin of Olmec civilization

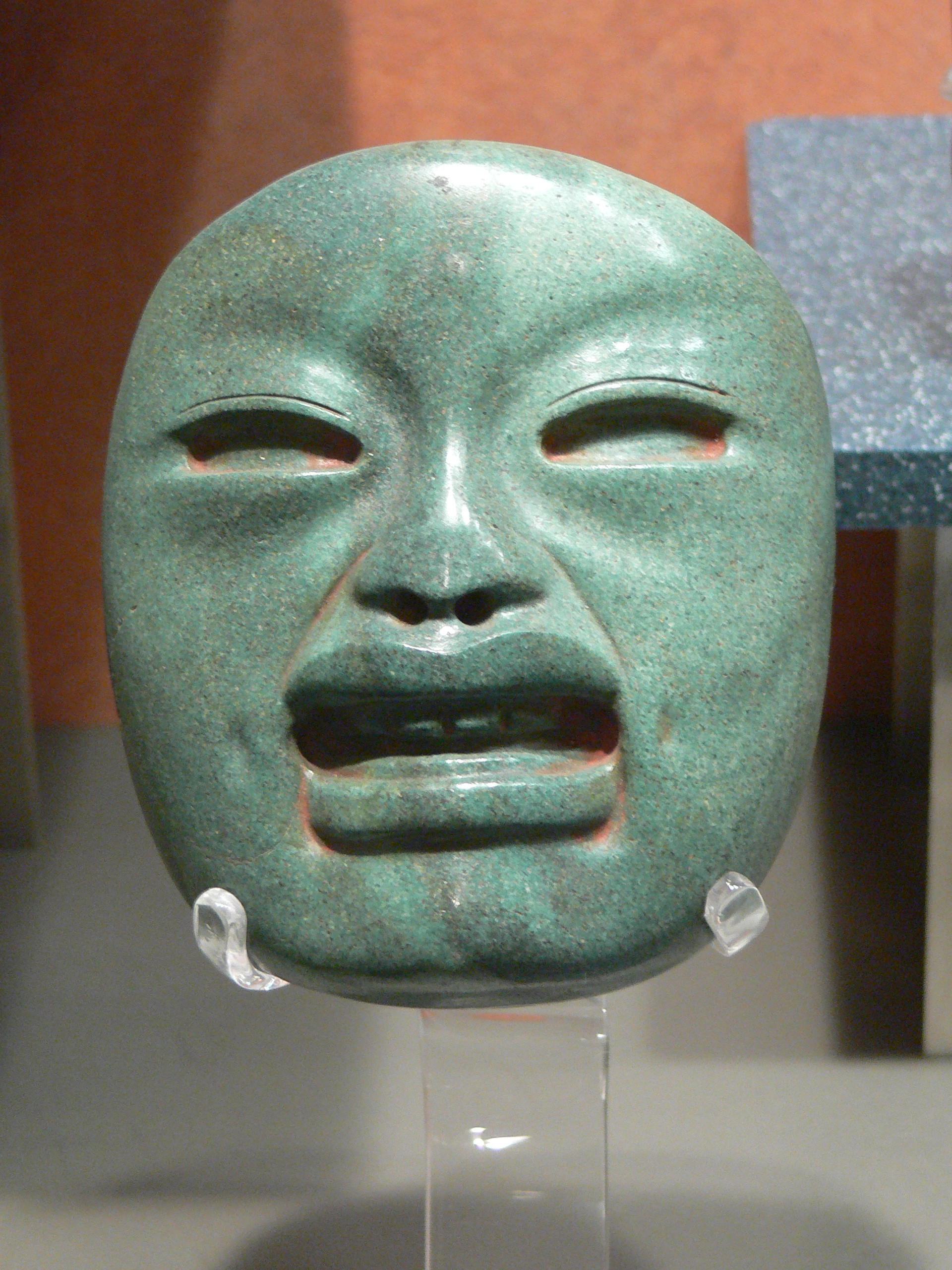
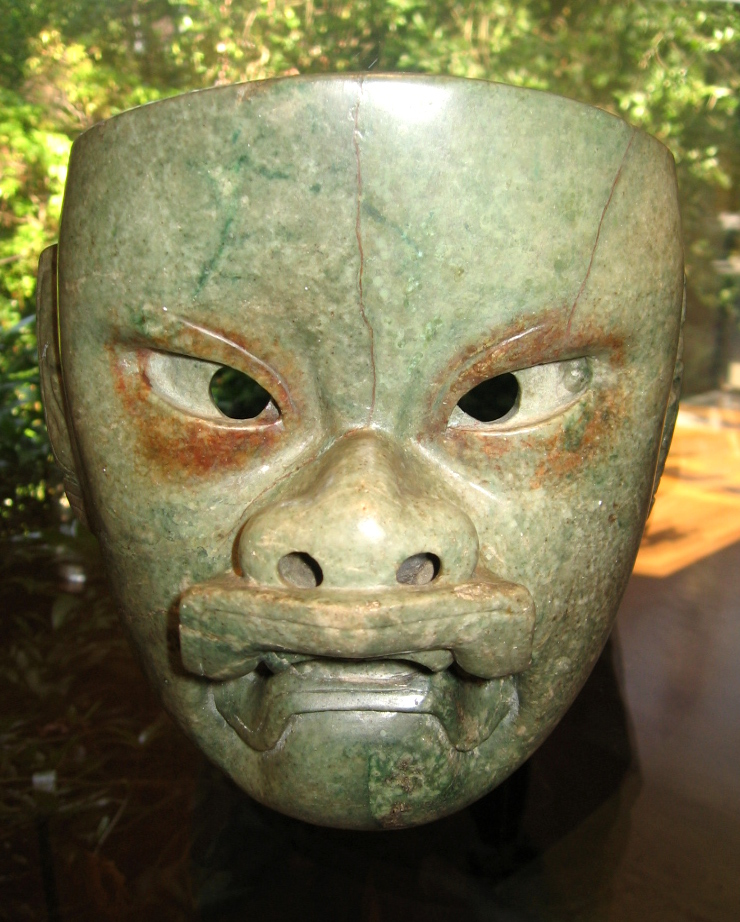
Olmec jadeite masks. Facial features such as almond-shaped eyes (supposed feature of Chinese origin) and prominent lips (supposed feature of African origin) are put forward as proof by supporters of alternative origins. Both almond-shaped eyes and snarled mouths are characteristic of the were-jaguar motif common in Olmec art.

Olmec alternative origin speculations are non-mainstream pseudohistorical theories relating to the formation of Olmec civilization which contradict generally accepted scholarly consensus, which holds that Olmec civilization is entirely indigenous to the region or at least to the New World. These origin theories typically involve contact with Old World societies. Although these speculations have become somewhat well-known within popular culture, particularly the idea of an African connection to the Olmec, they are not regarded as credible by mainstream researchers of Mesoamerica and are considered fringe theories.

== Mainstream scientific consensus ==
The great majority of scholars who specialize in Mesoamerican history, archaeology and linguistics remain unconvinced by alternative origin speculations. Many are more critical and regard the promotion of such unfounded theories as a form of ethnocentric racism at the expense of indigenous Americans. The consensus view maintained across publications in peer-reviewed academic journals that are concerned with Mesoamerican and other pre-Columbian research is that the Olmec and their achievements arose from influences and traditions that were wholly indigenous to the region, or at least the New World, and there is no reliable material evidence to suggest otherwise. They, and their neighbouring cultures with whom they had contact, developed their own characters which were founded entirely on a remarkably interlinked and ancient cultural and agricultural heritage that was locally shared, but arose independently of any extra-hemispheric influences.

=== DNA ===
A study of mitochondrial DNA in 2018 was carried out on two Olmec individuals, one from San Lorenzo and the other from Loma del Zapote. Both individuals were found to belong to mitochondrial haplogroup A, the most abundant of the five mitochondrial haplogroups characteristic of the indigenous populations of the Americas.

== African origins ==
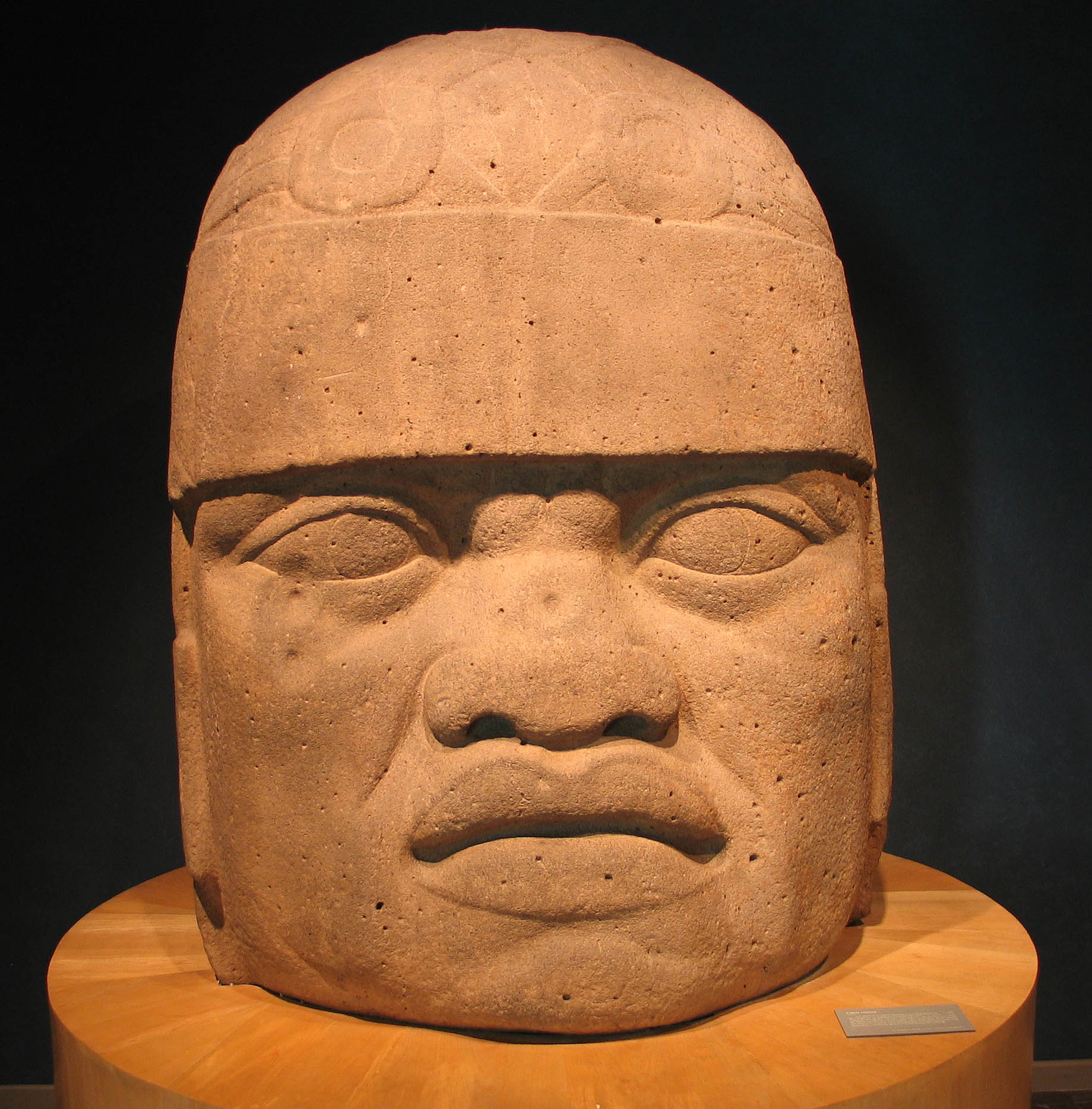
San Lorenzo Tenochtitlán Colossal Head 6, a 3-meter-high Olmec sculpture with lips and nose said to resemble African facial features.

Some writers suggest that the Olmecs were related to peoples of Africa, based primarily on their interpretation of facial features of Olmec statues. They additionally contend that epigraphical, genetic, and osteological evidence supports their claims. The idea was first suggested by José Melgar, who discovered the first colossal head at Hueyapan (now Tres Zapotes) in 1862 and subsequently published two papers that attributed this head to a "Negro race". The view was espoused in the early 20th century by Leo Wiener and others. Afro-centrist Ivan Van Sertima identified the Olmecs with the Mandé people of West Africa.

=== Claims of epigraphic evidence ===
Some researchers claim that the Mesoamerican writing systems are related to African scripts. In the early 19th century, Constantine Samuel Rafinesque proposed that the Maya inscriptions were probably related to the Libyco-Berber writing of Africa. Leo Wiener argued that Arabized "Black" West Africans influenced the cultures of Mexico which alongside the discovery of the Olmec heads resulted in more speculation, in particular, the symbols on the Tuxtla Statuette, Teo Mask, and the celts (tools) in Offering 4 at La Venta.

These assertions have found no support among Mesoamerican researchers. While mainstream scholars have made significant progress translating the Maya script, researchers have yet to translate Olmec glyphs.

=== Claims of osteological evidence ===
Polish craniologist Andrzej Wiercinski claims that some of the Olmecs were of African origin. He supports this claim with cranial evidence from two Mesoamerican sites: Tlatilco and Cerro de las Mesas. Tlatilco is a site in the Valley of Mexico. Although outside the Olmec heartland, Olmec influences appear in the architectural record. The crania were from the Pre-Classic period, contemporary with the Olmec. Cerro de las Mesas is within the Olmec heartland, although according to Wiercinski, "the series . . . is dated on the Classic period."

To determine the racial heritage of the skeletons, Wiercinski used classic diagnostic traits, determined by craniometric and cranioscopic methods, as well as the Polish Comparative-Morphological School skeletal reference collection. These measurements were then compared against three crania sets from Poland, Mongolia and Uganda to represent three racial categories which allowed Wiercinski to sort each skull into one or more racial categories.

Based on his comparisons, Wiercinski found that 14% of the skeletons from Tlatilco and 4.5% of the skeletons from Cerro de las Mesas had elements of "Black" racial composition.

In the last section of his paper, Wiercinski compared the physiognomy of the skeletons to corresponding examples of Olmec sculptures and bas-reliefs on the stelas. For example, Wiercinski states that the colossal Olmec heads represent the "Dongolan" type. The empirical frequencies of the Dongolan type at Tlatilco calculated by Wiercinski was 0.231, more than twice as high as Wiercinski's theoretical figure of 0.101, for the presence of Dongolans at Tlatilco.

Wiercinski summarizes his research by offering the following "ethnogenetical hypotheses":

- The indigenous rootstock of Tlatilco and Cerro de las Mesas consists of "Ainoid, Arctic, and Pacific racial elements".
- "A next migratory wave" brought in additional Pacific as well as "Laponoid" elements.
- "Some Chinese influence of Shang Period could penetrate Mesoamerica"
- "A strange transatlantic, more or less sporadic migration" brought Armenoid, Equatorial, and Bushmenoid elements.

Wiercinski's research methods and conclusions are not accepted by the vast majority of Mesoamerican scholars, in part because of his reliance on the Polish Comparative-Morphological methodology which limits the placement of skull types within a very narrow spectrum that is often within Caucasoid, Negroid, and Mongoloid. Native Americans are thus made to fit within these groups which often yields false and contradictory assumptions as a result of sample bias.

An interdisciplinary analysis of Native American skulls confirmed that Beringia "was the homeland of Native Americans" and stated that "The evolution and diffusion of an extremely derived north-east Asian phenotype, the high heterogeneity of founder groups, and the beginning of in situ New World evolution shaped by migration and genetic drift explains the entire pattern of past and present Native American variation. Most modern populations can be shown to have a mosaic of generalized-derived traits, while a few of them (Aleut-Eskimos) display the derived extreme also present in northeast Asia, and others present a rather generalized, ancestral morphology (Pericu, Aztecs, and Paleoamericans)".

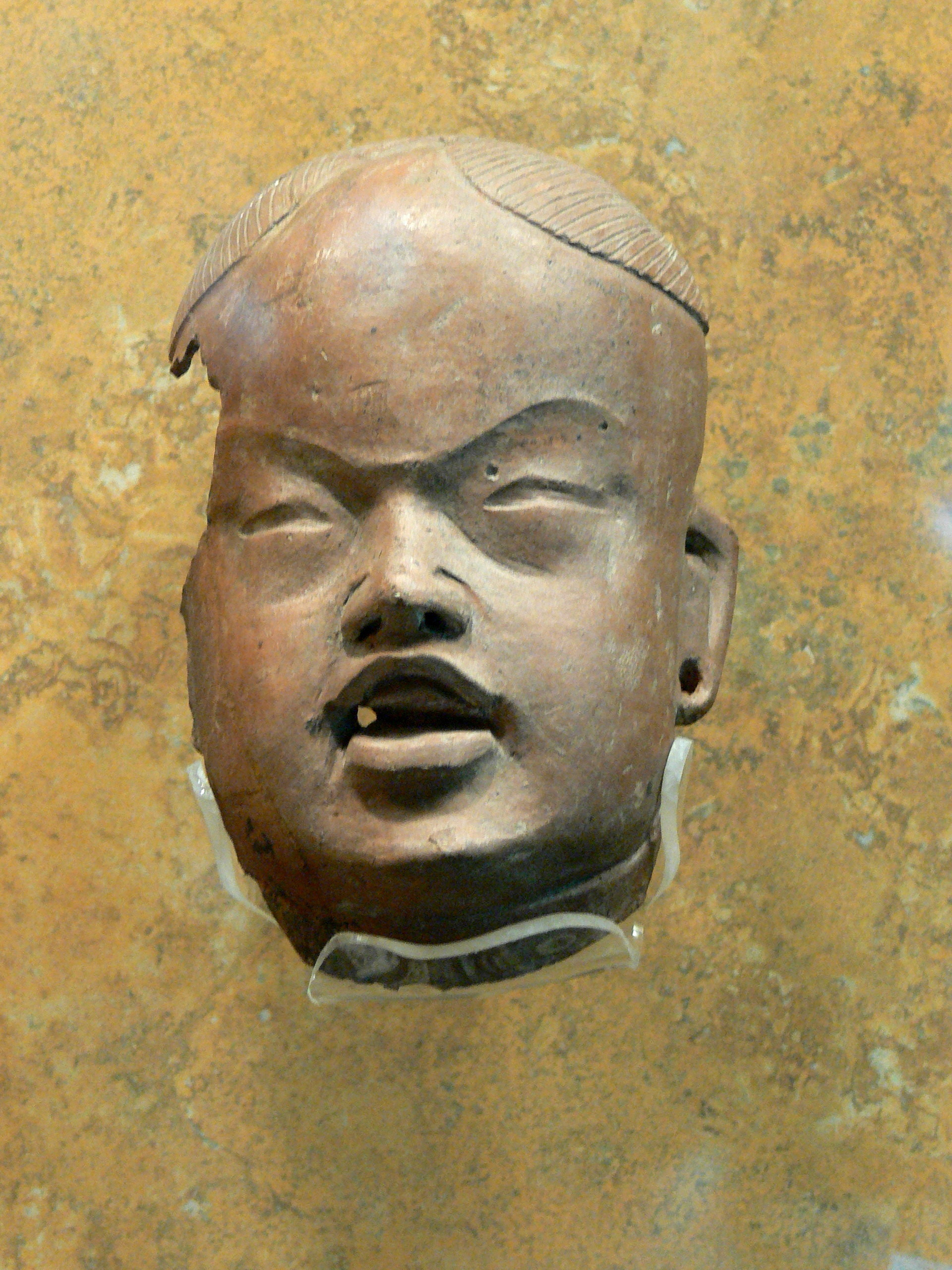
Head of an Olmec baby figurine. Gordon Ekholm, who was an archaeologist and curator at the American Museum of Natural History, suggested that the Olmec art style might have originated in Bronze Age China.

== Chinese origins ==
Some writers claim that the Olmec civilization came into existence with the help of Chinese refugees, particularly at the end of the Shang dynasty. In 1975, Betty Meggers of the Smithsonian Institution argued that the Olmec civilization originated due to Shang Chinese influences around 1200 BC. In a 1996 book, Mike Xu, with the aid of Chen Hanping, claimed that the very same La Venta celts discussed above actually bore Chinese characters. These claims are unsupported by mainstream Mesoamerican researchers. The evidence relied on by Mike Xu, including the coincidence of markings on Olmec pottery with those on Chinese oracle bone writings, the significance of jade in both cultures and the shared knowledge of the position of true North, was discussed in an article by Claire Liu in 1997.

== Jaredite origins ==
In the Book of Mormon (1830), a text regarded as scripture by churches and members of the Latter Day Saint movement, the Jaredites are described in the Book of Ether as a people who left the Old World in ancient times and founded a civilization in the Americas. Mainstream American history and literature specialists place the literary setting for the Book of Mormon among the "mound-builders" of North America. The work is therefore classified in the American "mound-builder" genre of the 19th century.

However, Mormon scholars and authors seek to demonstrate that events described in the Book of Mormon have a literal foundation. A popular Book of Mormon geography model places the scene of the Jaredite arrival and subsequent development in lands around the Isthmus of Tehuantepec in Mesoamerica. The tradition leading to this Mesoamerican model, however, does not clearly originate with the Book of Mormon, but with enthusiastic interest in John Lloyd Stephens's 1841 bestseller, Incidents of travel in Central America, Chiapas and Yucatan. Mormon founder Joseph Smith placed the arrival of the Jaredites in "the lake country of America" (region of Lake Ontario), allowing for the eventual migration of Book of Mormon peoples to Mexico and Central America.

Some Mormon scholars therefore identify the Olmec civilization with the Jaredites, citing similarities and noting that the period in which the Olmecs flourished and later declined corresponds roughly with the Jaredite civilization timeline.

== Nordic origins ==
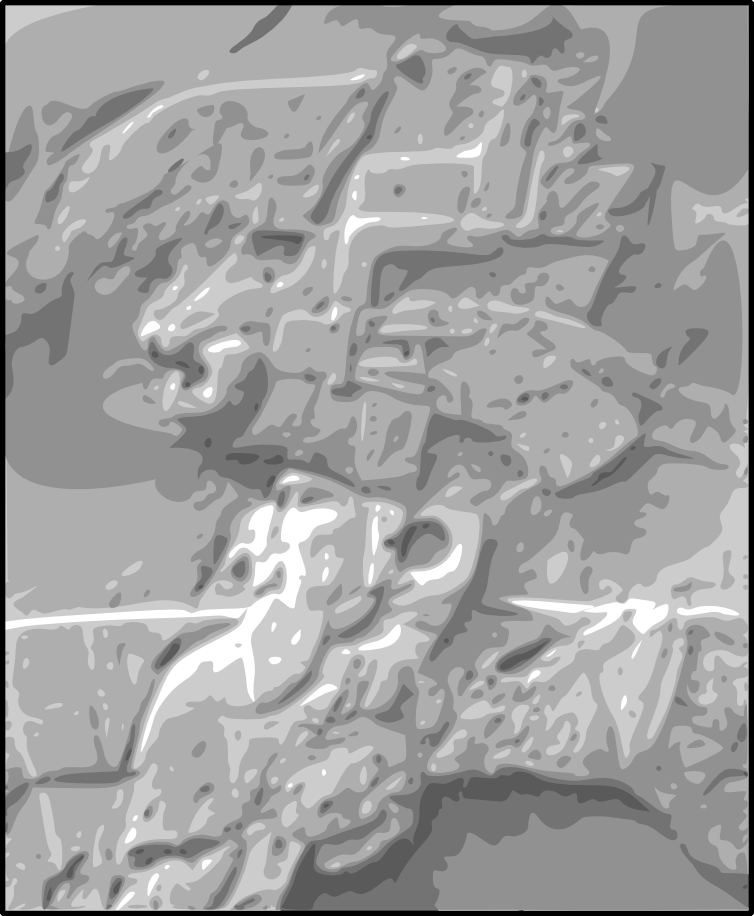
Detail of the carved portrait nicknamed "Uncle Sam" by researchers

According to Michael Coe, explorer and cultural diffusionist Thor Heyerdahl claimed that at least some of the Olmec leadership had Nordic ancestry, a view at least partly inspired by the bearded figure, often referred to as "Uncle Sam", carved into La Venta Stela 3, whose apparent aquiline nose has been cited as possible evidence for ancient visitors to the Americas from the Old World:

The presence of Uncle Sam inspired Thor Heyerdahl, the Norwegian explorer and author of The Kon-Tiki Expedition, among others to claim a Nordic ancestry for at least some of the Olmec leadership ... [However], it is extremely misleading to use the testimony of artistic representations to prove ethnic theories. The Olmec were American Indians, not Negroes (as Melgar had thought) or Nordic supermen.

== In popular culture ==
"The Olmec Football Player" is a 1980 short story by Katherine MacLean. In it, at least one of the Olmec colossal heads depicts an African-American college student who traveled back in time while wearing his football helmet.

In The Mysterious Cities of Gold, the few remaining Olmecs are described as being descendants of Atlanteans.

== See also ==
- Ancient Egyptian race controversy
- Pre-Columbian trans-oceanic contact theories
- Settlement of the Americas
- Francisco Plancarte y Navarrete (Tamoanchán: the state of Morelos and the beginning of civilization in Mexico)
