= Soldado (surname) =

Soldado is a surname associated with the occupation of a soldier. Notable people with the surname include:

- Juan Soldado (executed 1938), "Soldier John" a Mexican criminal and folk saint
- Roberto Soldado (born 1985), a Spanish football player.
