= Olmec heartland =

Home of the Olmec culture in south east Mexico

Coordinates: 17°50′N 94°38′W

The Olmec heartland. The yellow dots represent ancient habitation sites, while the red dots represent isolated artifact finds unassociated with any ancient town or village.

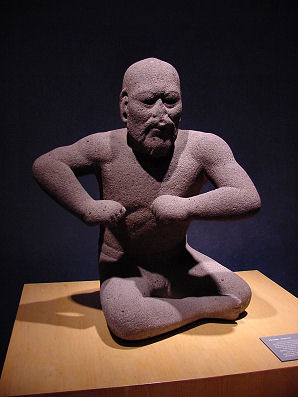
The Wrestler, an Olmec era statuette, 1200 - 800 BCE. Art historian George Kubler finds that "the spiraling motion of the body, the multiplicity of profile, the coherent muscles, and the expressive estraint of the work set it apart as among the great works of sculpture of all ages". Michael Coe finds it "one of the supreme examples of Olmec art".

The Olmec heartland is the southern portion of Mexico's Gulf Coast region between the Tuxtla mountains and the Olmec archaeological site of La Venta, extending roughly 80 km (50 mi) inland from the Gulf of Mexico coastline at its deepest. It is today, as it was during the height of the Olmec civilization, a tropical lowland forest environment, crossed by meandering rivers.

Most researchers consider the Olmec heartland to be the home of the Olmec culture which became widespread over Mesoamerica from 1400 BCE until roughly 400 BCE. The area is also referred to as Olman or the Olmec Metropolitan Zone.

The major heartland sites are:

- San Lorenzo Tenochtitlán
- La Venta
- Tres Zapotes
- Laguna de los Cerros - the least researched and least important of the major sites.

Smaller sites include:

- El Manatí, an Olmec sacrificial bog.
- El Azuzul, on the southern edge of the San Lorenzo area.
- San Andrés, near La Venta.

Important heartland finds not associated with any archaeological site include:

- "The Wrestler", a basalt statue found at Arroyo Sonso (see photo).
- Las Limas Monument 1, found by two children looking for somewhere to crack nuts.
- San Martín Pajapan Monument 1, found high on the slopes of San Martin Pajapan.

== See also ==
- Olmec influences on Mesoamerican cultures
- List of archaeological sites in Veracruz
