= San Martín Pajapan Monument 1 =

Olmec basalt sculpture in Veracruz, Mexico

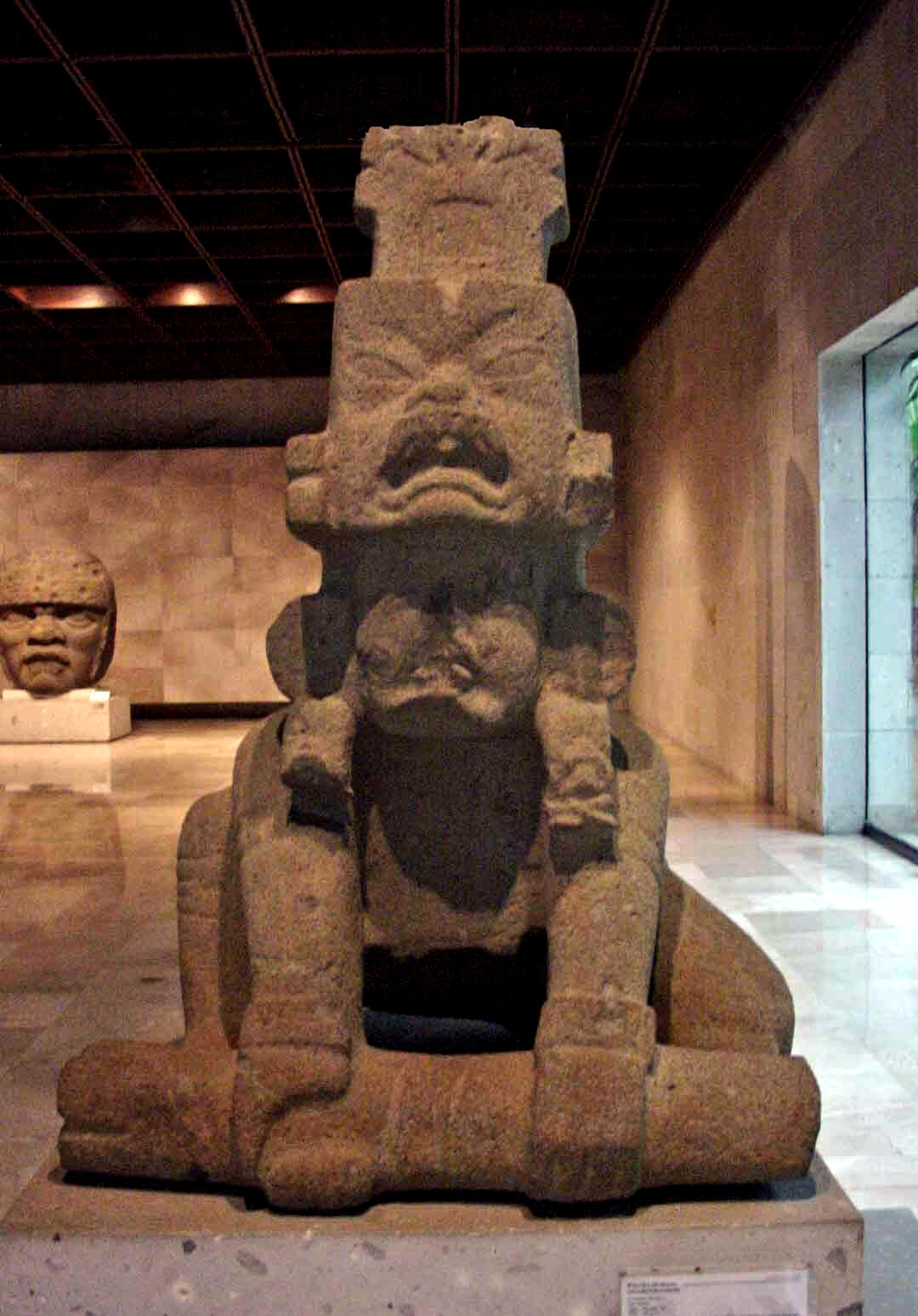
- Not all monumental art was associated with towns or villages - San Martin Pajapan Monument 1 was found at the peak of a dormant volcano.
- Material: Basalt
- Height: 1.4 meters
- Created: c. 1000 BC
- Discovered: 1925; Veracruz, Mexico
- Discovered by: Frans Blom and Oliver Farge
- Present location: Xalapa Museum of Anthropology

San Martín Pajapan Monument 1 is a large Olmec basalt sculpture found on top of the San Martin Pajapan volcano, in the Tuxtla Mountains of the Mexican state of Veracruz. It is notable for its original location and its Olmec iconography.

== Description ==
Likely carved during the Early Formative period, before 1000 BCE, the 1.4 m (5.5 ft) tall statue shows a crouching young lord. Caught in the act of raising a large ceremonial bar, his right hand is under one end and his left over the other end. This pose, nearly identical to that of the "twins" at El Azuzul, is thought to represent a ruler or shaman (or both) shown in the ritual act of raising the Mesoamerican world tree or axis mundi, an act that establishes the center of the world and connects the earthly plane with the worlds above and below.

The plump face is proto-typically Olmec, with "no attempt to represent individuality".

The young lord wears a huge boxy headdress, the front of which is covered with what is apparently a mask. The mask shows the cleft head, the almond eyes, and the downturned mouth characteristic of the Olmec were-jaguar supernatural, implying that the human had become, or was acting under the authority and/or the protection of, the supernatural.

Plumes flow backward along the sides of the headdress. From its top, vegetation – perhaps maize – is sprouting. This were-jaguar mask is identified with the Olmec rain god, and the iconography and the location of the statue reflect the widespread Mesoamerican belief in mountaintops as the dwelling of rain gods.

== Archaeological discovery ==
The original location of the San Martin Pajapan Monument 1 in the context of the Olmec heartland. The yellow dots represent ancient habitation sites, while the red dots represent isolated artifact finds unassociated with any ancient town or village.

The sculpture was first identified by surveyor Ismael Loya in 1897 and re-discovered by Frans Blom and Oliver La Farge in their expedition of 1925. Located on a platform or "level" in the saddle between the two highest peaks of volcano's crater rim, the statue was found surrounded by broken offering vessels, jade offerings, and numerous other objects, dating from ancient times to the 20th century, indicating it had been an object of veneration for millennia. These offerings and the statue itself served to identify the San Martin Pajapan mountaintop as a sacred landscape.

Although well preserved, the face had been particularly ravaged, perhaps intentionally. The statue was further damaged in 1897, when Loya broke off part of the arms stealing it. The statue, except for the face, has since largely been restored.

In 1929, Marshall Seville, from the Museum of the American Indian in New York, associated the statue with other unattributed artifacts in various collections, based on stylistic similarities and a common iconography. Since it was unlikely the statue had been moved far since its original site, Seville proposed that this "Olmec" artistic style (as he referred to it) originated in southern Veracruz.

The monument is on display at the Xalapa Museum of Anthropology in Veracruz.
