= El Cuajilote =

Archaeological site in Mexico

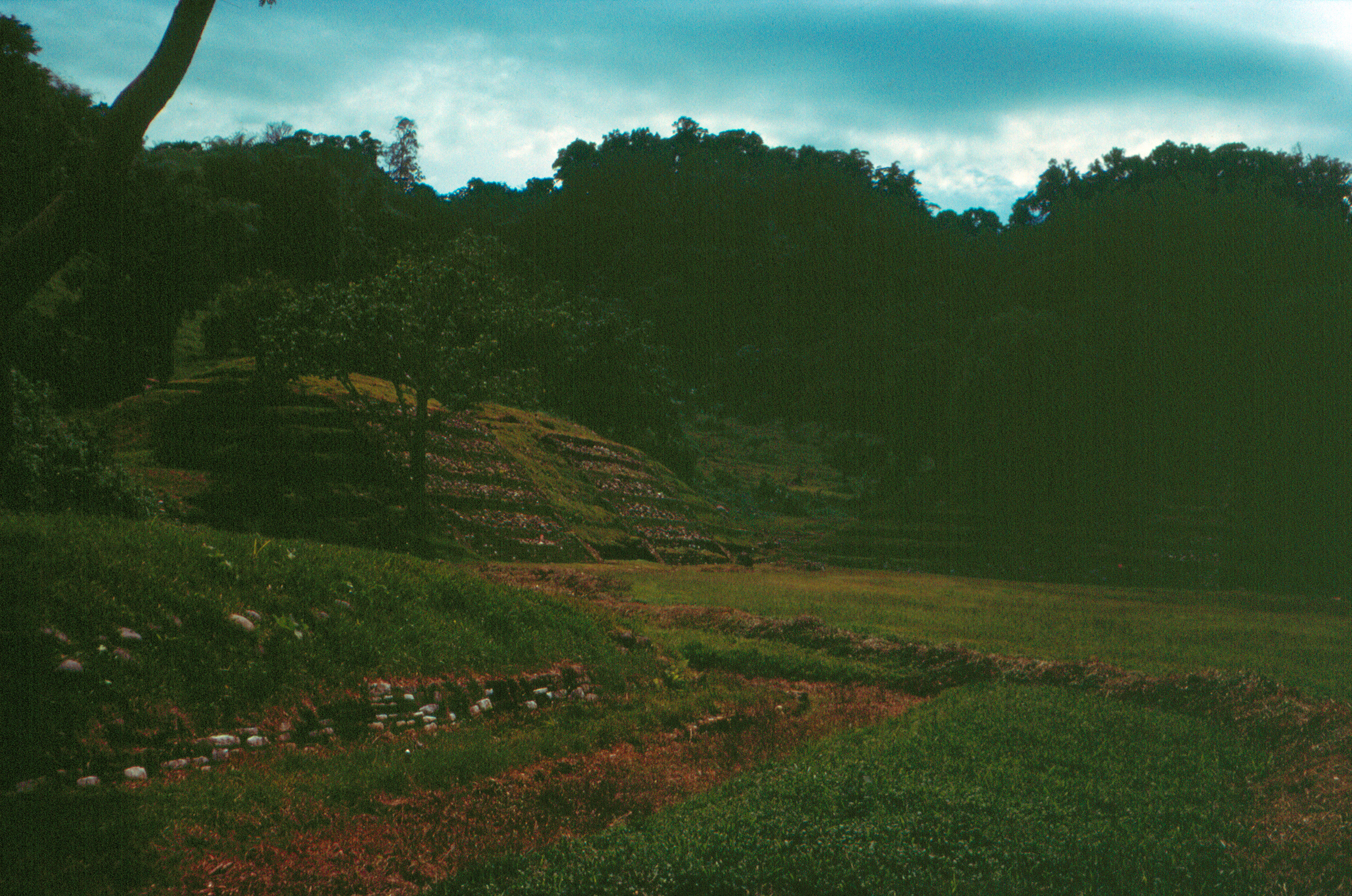
- Pyramid and Plaza
- Interactive map of El Cuajilote
- 19°56′21″N 97°08′15″W
- Periods: Preclassical–Classical Mesoamerican
- Cultures: Totonac
- Location: Atzalan, Veracruz, Mexico

History
- Built: Around 200 CE

Site notes
- Website: Filobobos archaeological site

El Cuajilote or Filobobos is an archeological site of the Totonac Culture, located in the Tlapacoyan municipality, Veracruz state, México.

Just as in many other Mesoamerican sites, the original name is unknown and arbitrarily names are assigned, sometimes local names are used, in this case, the name “El Cuajilote” derives from the “Chote” tree from the Totonac region, although the tree is scarce in the area nowadays. This site is part of the Filobobos zone, where vestiges of at least six archaeological sites are known. Currently only two have been explored; Vega de la Peña and El Cuajilote.

Cuajilote, is also the name of a tree (Parmentiera aculeata), also known as huachilote or monkey cocoa, typical of low deciduous forest, exist in broad territories in the South and Centre Mexico.

According to INAH the Filobobos name derives from the local sharp profiles (“Filos”) of gorges and ravines, created by a geologic phenomenon from the Cenozoic era, and of “bobos”, name of an almost extinct fish variety, very appreciated in the region.

The gorges and water falls, have allowed a natural preservation of the Filobobos Archeological Site.

It is a very fertile region and from prehispanic time it has been an important natural communication corridor between the Central Plateau and the Gulf of Mexico, used by diverse ethnic groups for travels, in the process of commercial and cultural trade.

== Site history ==
This site is located within the urban area of Tlapacoya, Alonso de Molina, establishes that Atzalan is a Nahuatl word meaning "place where washing is done ", i.e. laundry. Cecilio Agustín Robelo, noted the word to be an impersonal verb “tlapa”, wash and yan, is the place where the verb’s action takes place, resulting in "place where washing or laundry takes place". Peñafiel interpreted the Tlapacoyan hieroglyph from the Matrícula de Tributos (Mendocino Codex) and adds establishes that the sign Teltl, means stone below water (atl) and above a fantastic figure which could be a white and black canvas with a hand over it, indicating a verbal word derived from Tlapaca "wash" ending with location prefix "Yan".

Atzalan is of Totonac origin, there was a large city here, known today as “Vega de la Peña”. In the 16th century here was an old town called Yohualtlacualoyan, ancient center of Tenochtitlan tributary cities, including the cities of: Xilochitlán Xochicuauhtlan, Tuchtlán Coapan, Aztapan and Acazacatlán

Historical records establish that this area was a tax collection center (products) for the empire in this zone, it collected several products, including bird feathers.

El Cuajilote flourished towards 200 CE, and had a constant occupation until 800 CE. Some constructions seem to have been altars, as vestiges indicate aspects of fertility and earth cult.

Permanence of inhabitants in the Filobobos archaeological zone was made possible by the availability of survival resources, the permanent supply of water and its constant exploration, complemented with the bordering archaeological niches in high and low lands around the gorges. The ball games are different in both sites and have opposite alignment.

== Site ==
Urban development is seen in the arrangement of the archaeological sites, which becomes evident by the urban planning adapted to the physiographic and natural terrain; for example hydraulic infrastructure is evident in the water wells, channels and Temazcales.

The great Totonaca Plaza, sheltered by cliffs, canyons and ravines is crossed by the Filobobos River, it is located in a very humid zone estimated at a little more than 2000 years old.

The site has an extension of about 31,500 square meters. It is estimated that there are 10.5 hectares of unexplored structures.

The main plaza has a phallic sculpture representing fertility.

Phallic figurines were found, of the type known as “San Jose de Acateno”, representing a dual personage, fertility and rebirth worship, manifested by cycles of constant life renovation, which culminates with the triumph of the sun over darkness of the underworld.

In this area, there are several archaeological sites not yet explored, including “Piedra Blanca” on the left bank of the river; “Vega de la Peña”, an ancient town, 3 km below; "La Colorada" on the road to Martínez de la Torre, and "El Relicario". This site was opened to the public in 1994.

== Structures ==
It is estimated that there are over 500 structures, with height ranging from 6 and 80 metros.

The Main plaza has 10 important side buildings and the main temple, there are other smaller plazas.

The site is laid out and aligned with three axes south-north, separated by well laid mounds that confine plazas of approximately 400 meters long by 80 meters wide with central altars. The main plaza is bordered on the north side by a ball game court.

=== Ball game ===
As part of the main plaza is the ballgame court, which enclose the central plaza to the north, the wall have stucco plaster remains. A feline sculpture with a spike for embedding and offering pots, possibly representing Tezcatlipoca.

The ballgame court, built on the river bank, is aligned northwest-southeast, adapted to the physiographical conditions imposed by the Bobos River, whose flow is towards the west.

The place have five building complexes, that for INAH reasons have been named in agreement with the cardinal position in which they are located; e.g., west, center, south and southeastern complex.

The ballgame courts evidences a large El Tajín style influence and conserves stucco plaster remains on its walls.

=== Tlaltecuhtli altar ===
This altar was named “Tlaltecuhtli”, represents a frog, carved from a single stone piece, displays on the sides a possible “Chalchihuitlxóchitl” or “divine flower”, as well as a mutilated face.

=== Temazcal ===
In front of the previous altar, an enormous circular Temazcal was excavated.

=== Geoglyphs ===
About a kilometer to the north, what are believed to be astronomical markers known as “Teos” or Geoglyphs were found, protruding about a meter from the ground, made from volcanic rock, with engraved figures and spirals indicating the site distribution, believed to have been markers for pilgrims.

=== Water spring temple ===
The "Templo del Manatial", is located at the top, shows remains of a double room. In the corner a water spring is located, it appears to have been used for ceremonial purposes.

== Vega de la Peña ==
Another close by site is “Vega de la Peña”, about 4 km north of El Cuajilote. This place was inhabited between 900 and 1500 AD, when their inhabitants constructed the “Fretwork Temple”, thus called because its facade exhibits a decorative strip that alludes to Xicalcoliuhqui or fire serpent.

== See also ==
- Tlapacoyan
