= Xalapa Museum of Anthropology =

Anthropological museum in Xalapa, Mexico

- Museo de Antropología de Xalapa
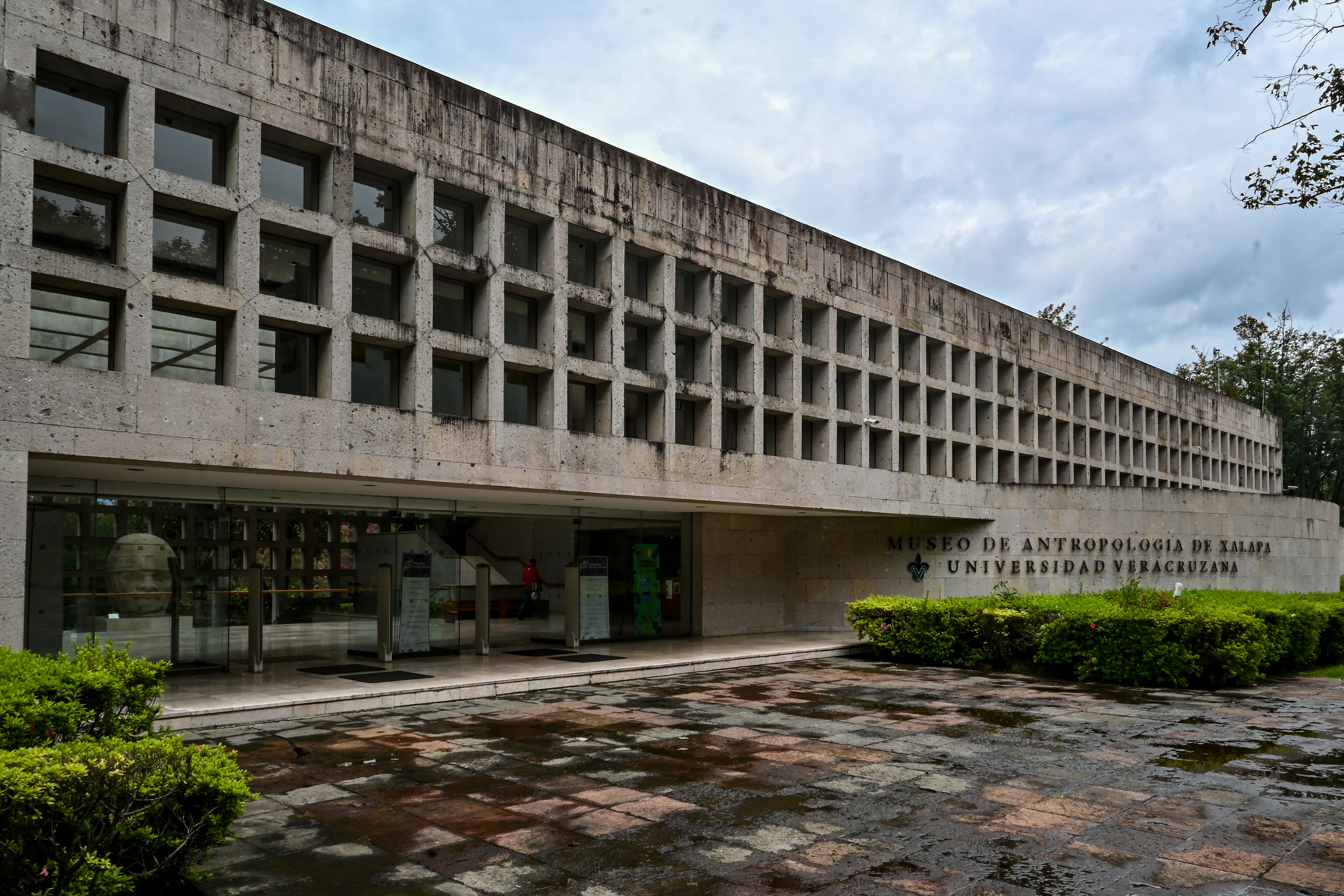
- The entrance to the museum
- Established: 1957
- Coordinates: 19.5505°N 96.9310°W
- Collection size: 25,000
- Website: www.uv.mx/max/

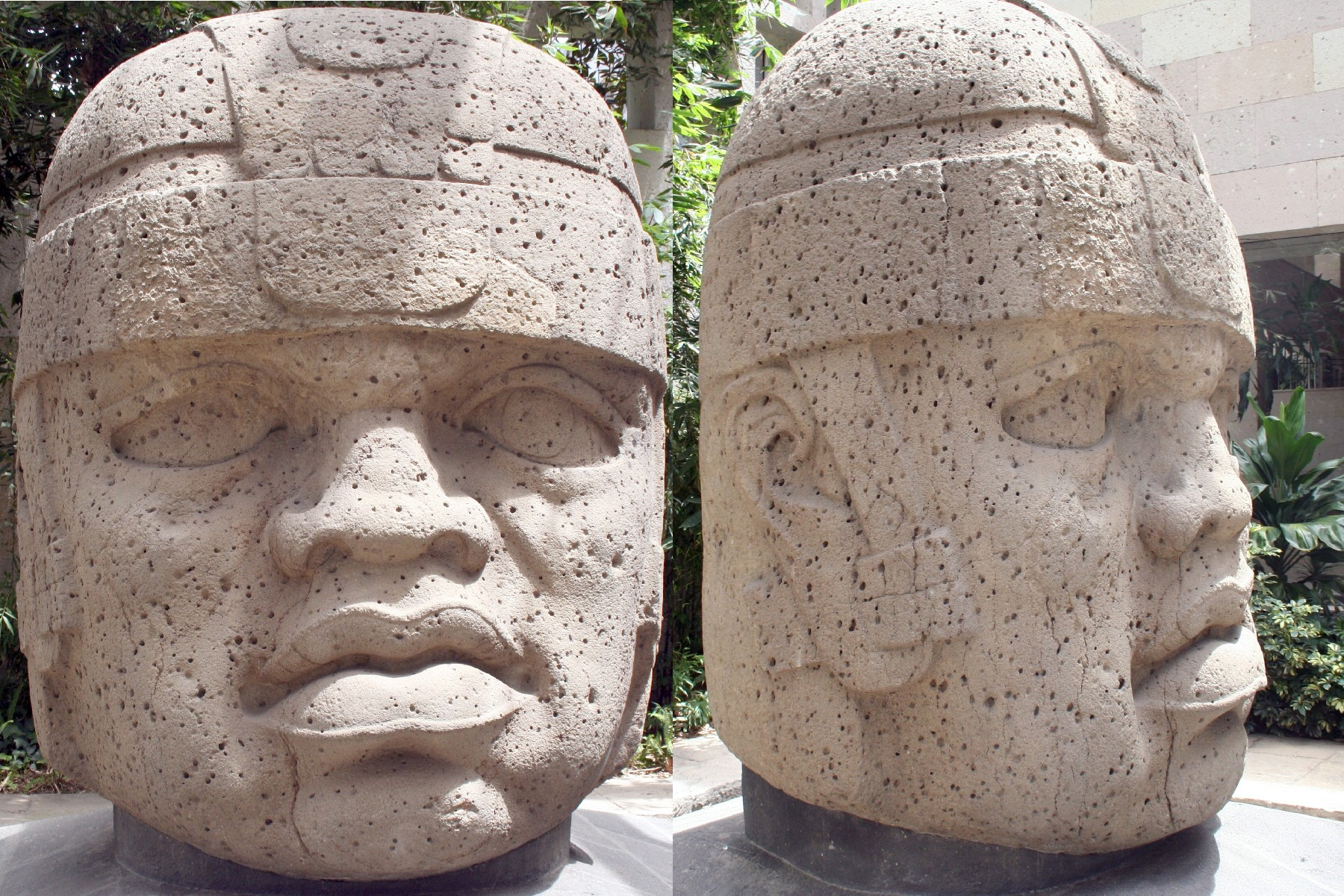
Two views of a giant Olmecs head in the museum discovered at an archaeological site in Texistepec, Veracruz

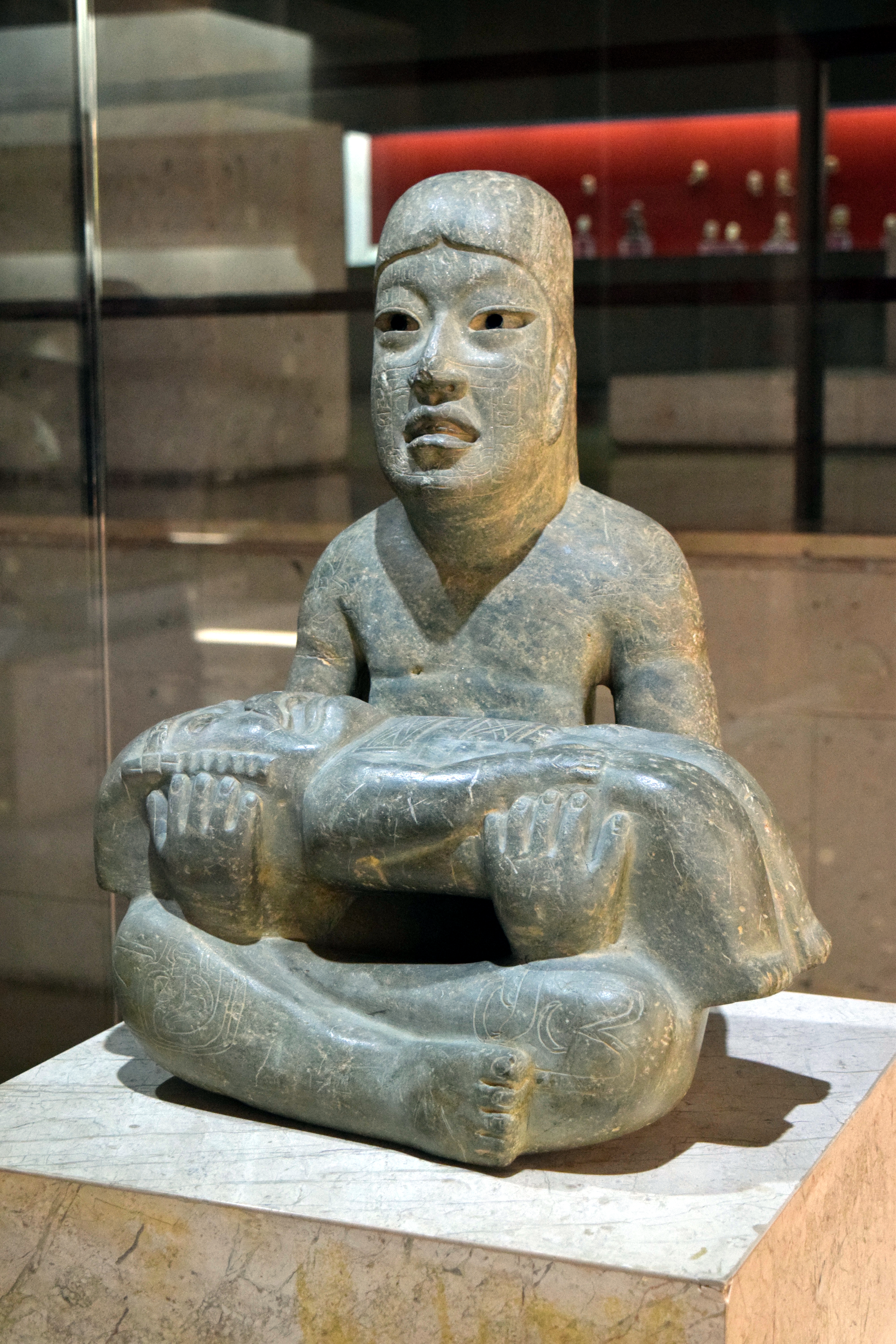
El Señor de las Limas

The Xalapa Museum of Anthropology (Spanish: Museo de Antropología de Xalapa; MAX) is an anthropological museum in the city of Xalapa, capital of the state of Veracruz in eastern Mexico. It is known for its collection of artifacts from Mesoamerican Gulf Coast cultures such as the Olmec, Totonac, and Huastec, including several Olmec colossal heads. The museum's current building was opened in 1986. It is a part of Veracruzana University.

Some of the pieces in the museum date back to the Early Pre-Classic Period from 1300 BC to 900 BC.

It is considered the second-most important anthropology museum in Mexico, after Mexico City's National Museum of Anthropology.

== History ==
The Museum of Anthropology of Xalapa was created more than fifty years ago as the Anthropological Museum of the Department of Education.

- 1943-DG Education initiative of Governor Jorge Cerda
- 1945-Governor Jorge Cerda created the Universidad Veracruzana
- 1947-pieces are placed in a building on the street
- 1951-Renamed Veracruzano Museum of Anthropology
- 1957-defining the orientation of its mission
  - Veracruzana University signed an agreement with the National Institute of Anthropology and History for the creation of the museum
- 1959-the collection numbered to about 10,000 pieces
- November 20, 1960-a new building opened to accommodate for all 10,000 pieces
- 1966-A second building was added, similar to the first, was erected to house the ethnographic material
- 1982-each of these entities acquires own leadership and management and are separated
- 1985-Governor Agustín Acosta Lagunes requested the demolition of the old building to build a building not only bigger but better adapted to the needs of the museum. He commissioned EDSA in New York City to design this new Museum of Anthropology in Xalapa. Paul Balev VP was the architect at EDSA who designed this museum.
- 1986-completion of museum

The current building was designed by Edward Durell Stone.

== Educational services ==
The Museum of Anthropology in Xalapa offers various educational services in order to improve the public knowledge at all levels. In addition to seek the historical, artistic and cultural development in a fun, meaningful and interesting way.

The museum holds a special interest in children, youth and families in the community. Guided tours for school groups, have created a better learning experiences, by either proving materials to students, inspiration, and even the potential possibility of a publication. This promote the development of creative skills and reflections.

== Gallery ==
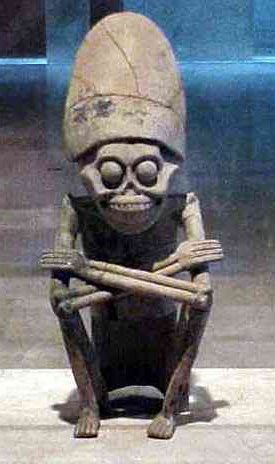
Mictlantecuhtli statue

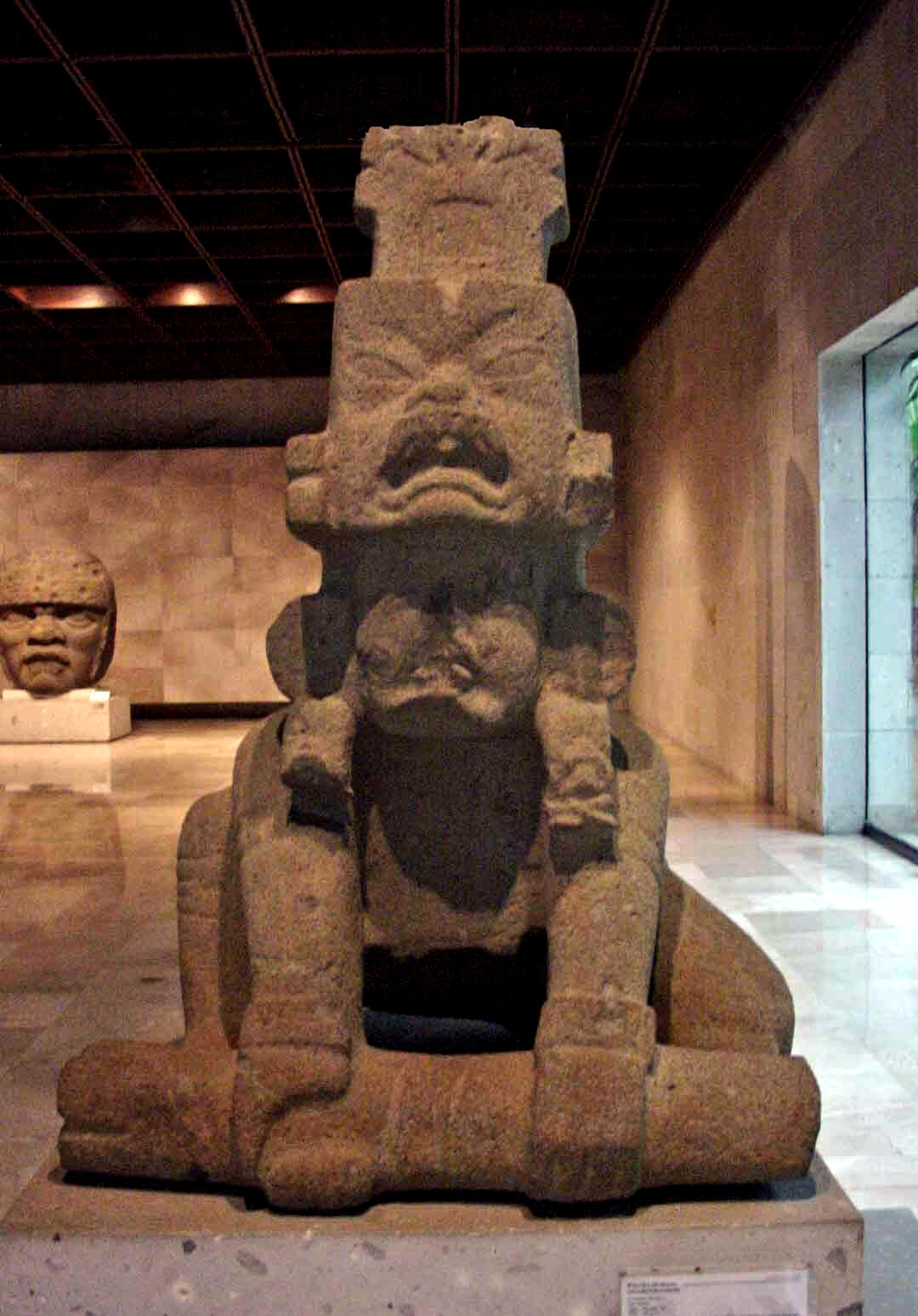
San Martin Pajapan Monument 1

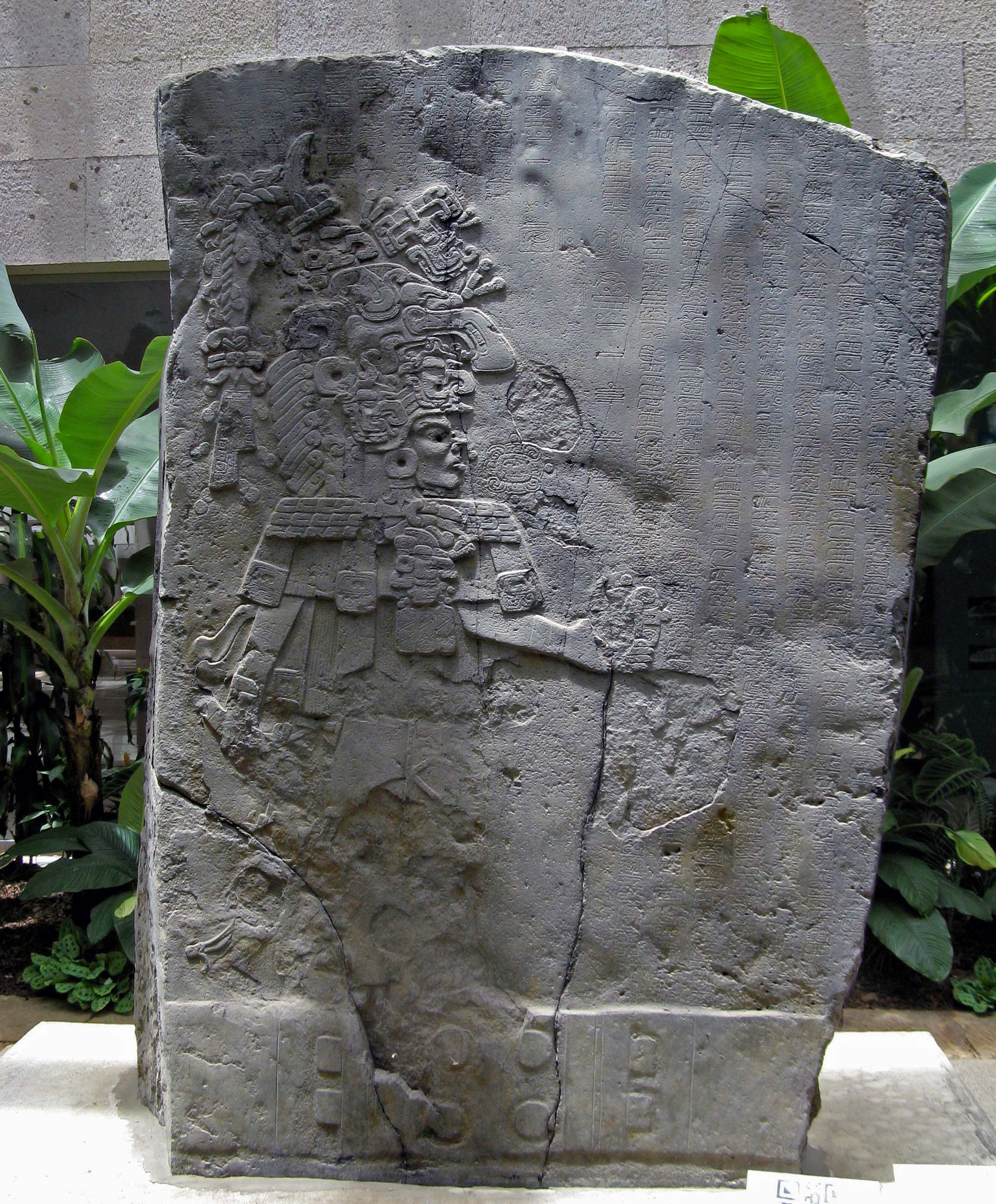
La Mojarra Stela 1

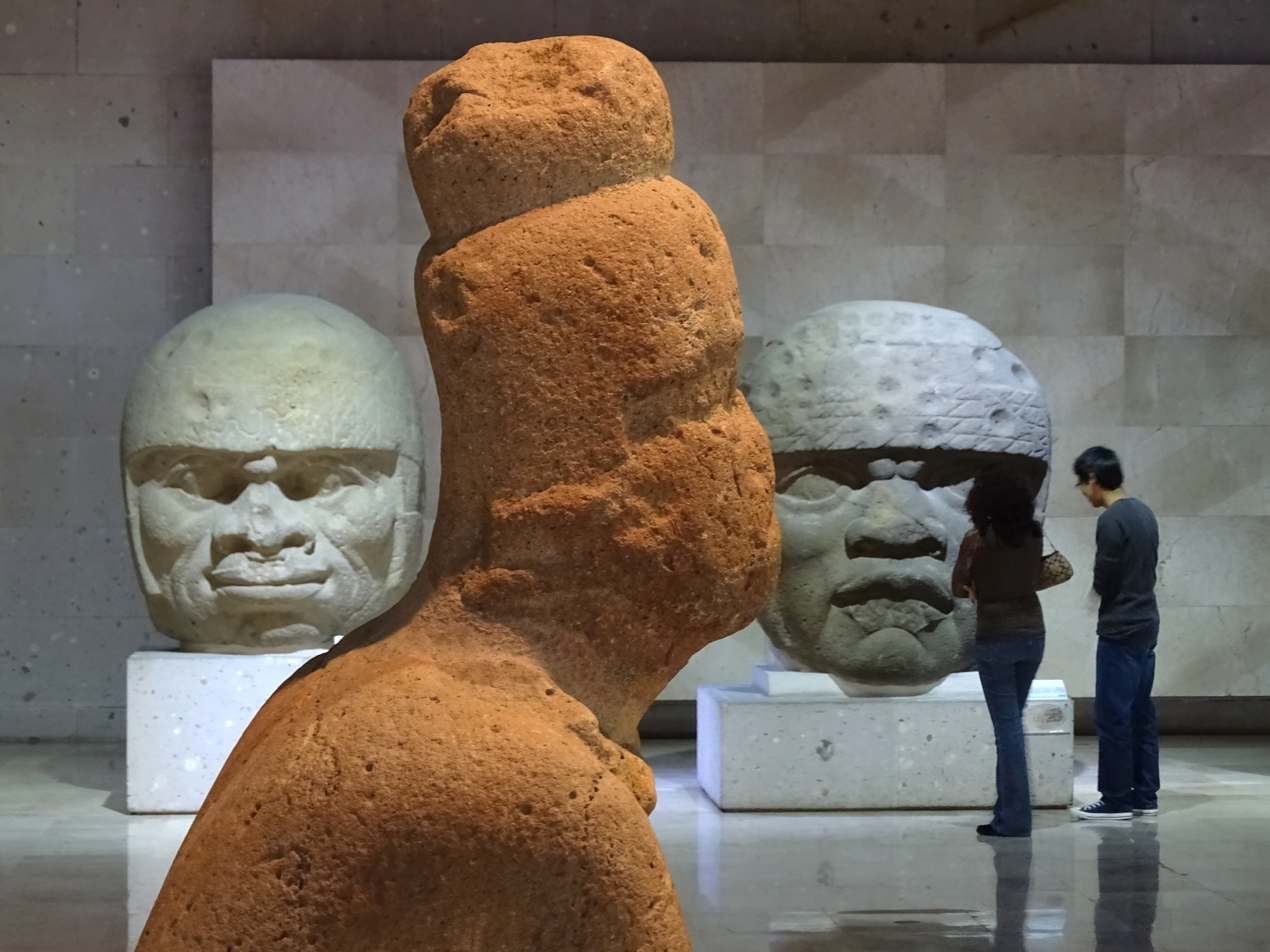
Olmec colossal heads

== Sources ==
- Ladron, Sara. "Museo De Antropología De Xalapa." Museo De Antropología De Xalapa. MAX, n.d. Web. 21 Mar. 2013.
