= El Manatí =

Archaeological site

- Four of the preserved wooden busts. Note the resemblance to this jade figurine.
- Interactive map of El Manatí
- 17°37′21″N 94°38′30″W
- Type: Mesoamerican archaeology
- Periods: Mesoamerican Preclassical
- Cultures: Olmec
- Location: Hidalgotitlán, Veracruz, Mexico
- Region: Mesoamerica (Mexico)

History
- Built: 1600–1200 BCE

El Manatí is an archaeological site located approximately 60 km south of Coatzacoalcos, in the municipality of Hidalgotitlán 27 kilometers southeast of Minatitlán in the Mexican state of Veracruz. El Manatí was the site of a sacred Olmec sacrificial bog from roughly 1600 BCE until 1200 BCE.

It is likely that this site, discovered in 1987, was used for ritual ceremonies which included offerings of wooden sculptures, rubber balls, ceremonial axes, and other items, including the bones of infants – all found in an excellent state of preservation in the muck. Most of the wooden sculptures are busts created in the "elongated man" style and are the oldest wooden artifacts yet found in Mexico. The rubber balls are also the earliest such items yet discovered and were possibly used in the Mesoamerican ballgame.

== The Olmec culture ==
The Olmec were a Pre-Columbian civilization living in the tropical lowlands of south-central Mexico, close to the border between the modern-day states of Veracruz and Tabasco. The Olmec flourished during Mesoamerica's Formative period, dating roughly from as early as 1500 BCE to about 400 BCE. Pre-Olmec cultures had flourished in the area since about 2500 BCE, but by 1600-1500 BCE early Olmec culture had emerged centered around the San Lorenzo Tenochtitlán site near the coast in southeast Veracruz. They were the first Mesoamerican civilization and laid many of the foundations for the civilizations that followed. Among other "firsts", there is evidence that the Olmec practiced ritual bloodletting and played the Mesoamerican ballgame, hallmarks of nearly all subsequent Mesoamerican societies.

== The site ==
El Manatí is located at the foot of Cerro Manatí, some 15 km (9.3 mi) southeast of the major Olmec center of San Lorenzo Tenochtitlán. It is notable among Olmec sites for the absence of contemporaneous local ceremonial or domestic architecture.

Archaeologists have identified three separate phases of deposits at El Manatí:

- Manatí A Phase (ca. 1700 - 1600 BCE)
- Manatí B Phase
- Macayal Phase (ca. 1040 BCE ± 150 years). The wooden busts were all found in this later phase.

El Manati may have been chosen as a sacred place because of one or more of its natural features:

- The presence of a natural spring, often a feature of Mesoamerican sacred sites.
- The presence of red pigment, likely hematite, which symbolized blood.
- Its location at the foot of a hill, Cerro Manatí. Many early Mesoamerican sites, including Chalcatzingo, Teopantecuanitlan, and Las Bocas, were situated east or west of a prominent hill.

== Discoveries ==
El Manatí and other Olmec heartland archaeological sites

Many artifacts have been found, among them wooden busts and rubber balls.

=== Wooden busts ===
Of particular note are 37 wooden busts or sculptures recovered from the bogs in 1989 by INAH archaeologists, during the third excavation phase at El Manatí. These busts were unusually well-preserved, owing to the anaerobic conditions of their interment and a stable water temperature that impeded microbial decay. Samples from two of these busts produced Carbon-14 dating results equivalent to a date of around 1200 BCE. Carved from the wood of ceiba and jobo trees, almost all of the busts had been ritually buried and wrapped in mats (petates) made from vegetable fibers—the earliest evidence of funeral wrappings in Mexico. The number of busts interred at or around the same time has led the INAH researchers to speculate that some widespread calamity, such as flood or prolonged drought, encouraged the ancient community to increase their offerings made in supplication to the mountain deities.

Despite the obviously stylized shape of the head, researchers suggest that, due to their individual expressions, the busts depicted actual persons. The wooden busts were usually accompanied by other objects. For example:

- Sculpture 1 was associated with a wooden staff and a dark green ax (celt).
- Sculpture 2 was associated with a large obsidian flake, tied bundles of leaves and plants, a hematite ball, a pile of sandstone rocks "common to a number of other sculptures," as well as fragments of human infant bones. Nearby to its east was the skeleton of an infant.
- Sculptures 5, 6, & 7 were interred as a group, each laid on their sides in a triangle, facing inward. These sculptures were associated with bundles of plant material and were covered with a mat. An incomplete wooden staff and an infant cranium were associated with this burial.

Some of these heads were stolen and later found in Germany in the hands of archaeological object traffickers. According to Mexico, these artifacts were stolen in the 1980s and passed through the hands of antiques dealer Leonardo Patterson, who later transferred the artifacts to Germany. These artifacts ended up in the Bavarian State Archaeological Collection. In 2018, the two heads were repatriated to Mexico.

=== Rubber balls ===
Twelve rubber balls associated with axe offerings were found in El Manatí in 1989. Their surprisingly excellent state of preservation led archeologists to suspect that the balls had received a vulcanization type process, and it was found that the balls were made of two types of vulcanized latex.

=== Ceremonial axes ===
In addition to the dozen rubber balls and 37 wooden busts, excavation has turned up many jadeite ceremonial axes (celts), pottery, greenstone beads arranged in clusters (likely once two separate necklaces), "baby-face" figurine fragments, carved wooden staffs, ritual obsidian knives (with no evidence of use), bones of newborn or unborn infants, and human and animal bone fragments. Most of these objects within the bog were found to be carefully arranged rather than haphazardly deposited, pointing to a sacred sacrificial intent.

=== Infant bones ===
The bones of the newborn or unborn infants consisted of some whole skeletons as well as dismembered femurs and skulls. These remains are particularly intriguing since they point to the possibility of human sacrifice, a ritual without direct evidence in the Olmec archaeological record. The infant remains are each associated with, and subordinate to, the burial of a wooden bust. It is not known how the infants died.

=== Cocoa traces ===
On July 30, 2008, INAH reported that testing of residues found in a ceramic container in El Manatí, dating from approximately 1750 BCE (at least between 1900 and 900 BCE), show that the container contained a cocoa drink base probably consumed by the elite of the site.

The ceramic vessel, which has slightly divergent cylindrical walls, a flat bottom, black spots and a red slip on its bottom, was associated with other sumptuary objects. It is believed that this type of vessel was used for drinks such as "chicha" (maize beer), chocolate, and atole preparations which were consumed only by priests or other people of high social prestige. Content verification tests yielded the presence of theobromine, an essential cocoa component; chromatography and UV tests detected ions of cocoa's chemical components. This evidence predates other evidence found in Mayan areas of Belize and Puerto Escondido, Honduras.

== Olmec technology ==
The Olmec knew how to produce rubber and various uses of it, and probably had technological processes for vulcanization and for waterproofing with tar.

Multiple studies by several specialists have established that to create the rubber balls, the Olmecs mixed latex from the rubber tree Castilla elastica with parts from the flowering vine Ipomoea alba, a species of morning glory which is farmed in tropical regions of Mexico and contains latex sulphides. A mix of the two will undergo a chemical reaction which allows the resulting mass to be vulcanized later on.

Rubber latex or ulli was obtained by cutting an incision in the tree and collecting the exuded latex, which in its natural state is a sticky milky fluid and when dry is very fragile and will not retain a form. The morning glory vine is crushed and the resulting liquid mixed into the latex. When this mixture solidifies, it forms a white mass which can be used to form balls.

There were probably two techniques used for making the balls. The first was to spread the rubber on a flat surface, let it dry and cut it into small strips. The second method was to cook the rubber and then shape it into a ball: this required high heat or vulcanization.

== See also ==
- Sacred Cenote, a natural spring and similar Maya offering site
