= San Lorenzo Tenochtitlán =

Collective name for three related archaeological sites in Veracruz, Mexico

Coordinates: 17°45′13″N 94°45′36″W

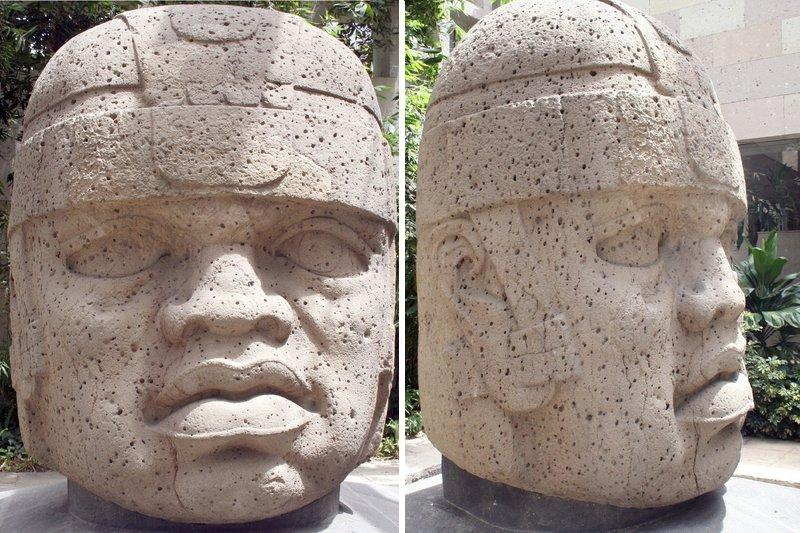
Front and side views of Colossal Head 1 now located at Xalapa Museum of Anthropology in Xalapa, Veracruz. This head dates from 1200 to 900 BCE and is 2.9 metres (9 ft 6 in) high and 2.1 metres (6 ft 11 in) wide.

San Lorenzo Tenochtitlán or San Lorenzo is the collective name for three related archaeological sites—San Lorenzo, Tenochtitlán and Potrero Nuevo—located in the southeast portion of the Mexican state of Veracruz. Along with La Venta and Tres Zapotes, it was one of the three major cities of the Olmec, and the major center of Olmec culture from 1400 BCE to 900 BCE. San Lorenzo Tenochtitlán is best known today for the colossal stone heads unearthed there, the greatest of which weigh 28 metric tons (28 long tons; 31 short tons) or more and are 3 metres (9.8 ft) high.

The site is not to be confused with Tenochtitlan, the Aztec capital located within Mexico City. Administrative names were translated into Aztec/Nahuatl and spread alongside Catholic names during the European conquest, replacing any original locality names, as the original Olmec name was lost.

== Description ==
The earliest evidence for Olmec culture is found at nearby El Manatí, a sacrificial bog with artifacts dating to 1600 BCE or earlier. Sedentary agriculturalists had lived in the area for centuries before San Lorenzo developed into a regional center.

San Lorenzo was the first Olmec site that demonstrates state level complexity. The site dominated the gulf coast lowlands, creating Olmec cultural diffusion throughout the rest of Mesoamerica. The iconic finds at the site are the famous colossal heads. The colossal heads stand up to 340 centimetres (130 in) tall. According to archaeological finds, archaeologists have divided the Olmec history into four stages: Formation stage (1700–1300 BCE), Integration stage (1300–900 BCE) Expansion stage (900–300 BCE) and Disintegration stage (300 BCE – 200 CE). Another term archaeologists use is for categorizing the Olmecs is the Formative Period, meaning the pivotal years that laid the ground work for state-level complex societies. Formative Mesoamerica can be divided into three periods: Early Formative (1800–900 BCE), Middle Formative (900–400 BCE) and Late Formative (400 BCE – 200 CE). San Lorenzo was the largest city in Mesoamerica from roughly 1200 BCE until 900 BCE, at which time it had begun to be overtaken by the Olmec center of La Venta. By 800 BCE, there was little or no population, although there was an important recolonization of the San Lorenzo plateau from 600 to 400 BCE and again from circa 800 to 1000 CE.

In contrast to La Venta's swamp-like environs, San Lorenzo was situated in the midst of a large agricultural area. San Lorenzo seems to have been largely a ceremonial site, a town without city walls, centered in the midst of a widespread medium-to-large agricultural population. The ceremonial center and attendant buildings could have housed 5,500 while the entire area, including hinterlands, could have reached 13,000.

It is thought that while San Lorenzo controlled much or all of the Coatzacoalcos basin, areas to the east (such as the area where La Venta would rise to prominence) and north-northwest (such as the Tuxtla Mountains) were home to independent polities.

Built on some 700 hectares (1,700 acres) of high ground between then-active tributaries, the core of San Lorenzo covers 55 hectares (140 acres) that were further modified through extensive filling and leveling; by one estimate 500,000 to 2,000,000 cubic metres (18,000,000 to 71,000,000 cu ft) of earthen fill were needed, moved by the basketload. The rulers of San Lorenzo played a crucial role in integrating a population that changed the natural environment into sacred and secular landscapes for the glorification of the San Lorenzo polity. Archaeologists Michael Coe and Richard Diehl calculated that the 77 square kilometres (30 sq mi) area of San Lorenzo that they studied could produce approximately 500 metric tons (490 long tons; 550 short tons) of maize annually, enough to feed 5,556 people, more than the estimated population at the time. Residents of San Lorenzo also consumed domestic dog, snook, tarpon, mojarra, catfish, and turtles. Although some claim that manioc was cultivated here, no evidence for this has been found.

San Lorenzo also boasted an elaborate drainage system which used buried, covered, channeled stones as a type of "pipe". Fresh spring water was available on the elevated lands, but not as available in the lowlands. Long lines of U-shaped drain stones directed water to the edges of the plateau, which reflected how the rulers directed and controlled this precious resource. Some researchers have inferred that the purpose of this system was not only to provide drinking water for the population but for ritual purposes as well, and that the rulership was "intimately linked to the figure of a patron water supernatural [sic]".

== Archaeological history ==
San Lorenzo and the Olmec heartland.

Matthew Stirling was the first to begin excavations on the site after a visit in 1938. Between 1946 and 1970, four archaeological projects were undertaken, including one Yale University study headed by Michael Coe and Richard Diehl conducted between 1966 and 1968, followed by a lull until 1990. Coe's research faced criticism from ecologically minded archaeologists, although his ecological study of San Lorenzo in the second volume of his book silenced his critics. The archaeological work recommenced in 1990, putting emphasis on the establishment pattern of community and regional levels ("en el patrón de asentamiento en los niveles de comunidad y de región".

The original Olmec name of the area, like all of the Olmec language, is unknown. The name "San Lorenzo Tenochtitlán" was coined by Stirling in 1955, taken from the nearby present-day villages, and refers to the entire complex of sites. Matthew Stirling gave the name San Lorenzo Tenochtitlan to a cluster of three settlements on an island in the swamps and marshes west of the Coatzacoalcos. San Lorenzo proper occupies the slopes and summit of a plateau that rises 50 m above the floodplain of the Coatzacoalcos River. The archaeological site of Tenochtitlán lies within the modern village of the same name at the northern end of the island, and Potero Nuevo occupies a hill east of the plateau. Another large site occupies the Loma del Zapote, a long ridge extending southward from the plateau, which includes the locality known as El Azuzul at its southern tip.

The archaeological sites of San Lorenzo Tenochtitlán can be visited Monday to Sunday, from 8:00 to 15:00 hours local time.

== Stone sculptures of San Lorenzo ==
The San Lorenzo site is well known for the multitude of stone sculptures displayed. Some of these sculptures depict supernatural deities, while others the flesh-and-blood embodiments on earth. Up to 124 stone sculptures have been discovered, and it is suspected that many more remain buried. The sculptures range in size, with the gigantic Colossal Heads weighing up to 28 tons. All the basalt used in this artwork originated at the Cerro Cintepec volcano in the Tuxtla mountains. These sculptures were not only done for aesthetic beauty, but also symbolized the awe-inspiring way that the Olmec viewed their deities. It also showed the power the rulers had, because a successful delivery of a stone or finished sculpture involved complex organization and the ability to order extreme amounts of labor.

== The eight major phases of occupation ==
In the 1960s, Michael Coe and Richard Diehl conducted excavations on San Lorenzo and surrounding sites, and defined eight major phases of occupation. The Ojochi (ca. 1750–1550 BCE) and Bajío (ca. 1550–1450 BCE) phases constituted the pre-Olmec Initial Formative sequence. In the Early Formative Chicharras phase (ca. 1450–1400 BCE) more characteristically Olmec artifacts appear on the site. San Lorenzo rose to the height of its power in the San Lorenzo phase (ca. 1400–1000 BCE). However, it suffered a decline in the beginning of the Middle Formative period. This period encompasses the Nacaste (ca. 1000–800 BCE) and the Palangana (ca. 800–400 BCE) phases. Its population declined further in the Late Formative Remplás phase (ca. 300–50 BCE), and while there was occupation in the surrounding area during the Early and Middle Classic periods, the site itself was not reoccupied until late in the Villa Alta phase (800–1000 CE).

== Architecture ==
At the top of the plateau of San Lorenzo, massive thrones, colossal heads, and smaller sculptures of humans, felines, birds, and supernatural monsters proclaimed the power of its rulers and its sacred source. Most of these sculptures were carved from imported basalt.

The elites of San Lorenzo lived in large structures raised on low clay platforms amid the monuments that legitimized their authority.

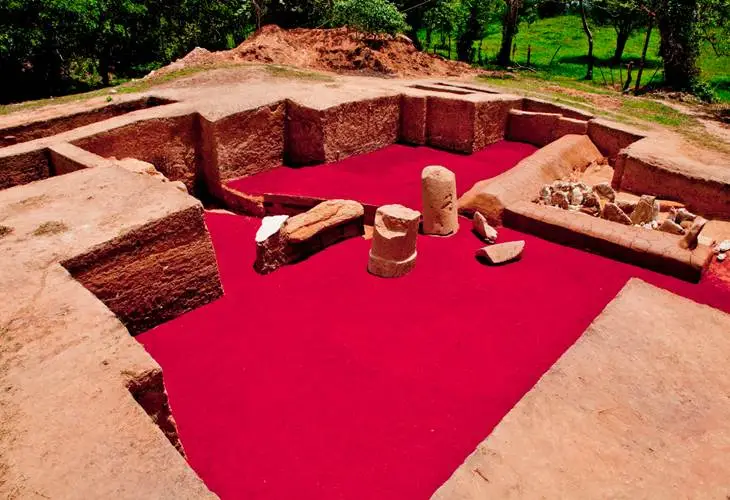
The "Red Palace" (or in Spanish "Palacio Rojo")

An elite residence named the "Red Palace" had earthen walls and floors, which were plastered with sand stained by hematite. Massive columns that were 4 metres (13 ft) tall and carved out of basalt supported the structure's roof, and L-shaped basalt benches are thought to have been used as step coverings. Blocks of bentonite clay and limestone have been found in the debris, and may have been used in the walls. Several structures had walls that were made of thick mud and 40 centimetres (16 in) thick, and lacked post-molds. They were evidently constructed using a rammed earth technique. Other structures employed bentonite masonry fixed with mud mortar. Floors were made of gravel or packed earth, or paved with bentonite blocks.

The common folk lived on the slopes of the plateau, stepping down to a level 40 m below the summit. Their houses were thatched wattle–and-daub houses. Impressive amounts of labor went into building the San Lorenzo terraces. One of these terraces was held in place by a 7-metre (23 ft) high retaining wall. It is unclear if these terraces and houses were ordered to be constructed by rulers, or initiated by a group of commoners.

Landscape modifications to the landscape around San Lorenzo also include causeways or dikes. The two largest ones bordered ancient river courses at Potrero Nuevo and El Azuzul, respectively. These may have provided some measure of flood control and possible served as wharfs for loading and unloading canoes.

Further archaeological study was conducted at the El Bajio section of El Remolino, a site in North San Lorenzo, by Carl J. Wendt. This, coupled with studies of more central San Lorenzo, revealed quite a bit about how houses were organized. Wendt studied refuse throughout the site, using that information to infer the layout of buildings. Clutter refuse, that is, refuse that is potentially valuable or hazardous, was studied and progressed through several stages of disposal: discarded along areas near house walls, then moved to dumps or pits. When people abandon a house, they usually leave refuse that is out of mind: behind large furniture, in corners, or outside on the periphery. Using this information, Wendt determined the likely architectural organization of the site. The data suggested that the architectural organization most likely followed the solar pattern of highland Maya house-lots. The solar pattern is unrestricted in space and has separate areas designated for separate activities, i.e. sleeping, cooking, etc. All these detached structures are built around a central patio area.

== Exports from San Lorenzo ==
Various types of Olmec style pottery and figurines originating in San Lorenzo area were exported to other areas in Mesoamerica. For example, at the Canton Corralito site in coastal Chiapas state, very large numbers were found.

Over 5,000 objects produced in the early Olmec style were found at Canton Corralito. In fact, many more Initial Olmec (1250-1150 BCE) and Early Olmec (1150-1000 BCE) type objects were found at Canton Corralito than at San Lorenzo area. For the Cuadros phase (Early Olmec horizon), 15 percent of the carved pottery (Calzadas Carved) and nine percent of the incised pottery (Limón Incised) was imported from San Lorenzo area. At the same time, none of the San Lorenzo objects examined so far were found to be imports from any other area.

== Fall of San Lorenzo ==
The cause of San Lorenzo's demise and later replacement with La Venta is unknown, although it most certainly occurred in the 10th century BCE. Coe and Diehl originally suggested internal revolt or external conquest, but Diehl has since changed his mind. He now believes that the monuments were frequently recarved and reused before the collapse and the "mutilation" was simply the middle of that process. Warfare, environmental changes, economic decline, and the emergence of rival centers have all been suggested as possible causes for the decline, although multiple causes were likely. Evidence shows that the rivers of the region did change course at the time; that may have initiated or exacerbated other problems at the site of San Lorenzo.

== See also ==
- El Azuzul, a small Olmec site just southeast of San Lorenzo Tenochtitlán and perhaps part of the complex.
- Tres Zapotes, a major Olmec and post-Olmec site roughly 100 miles (160 km) northwest of the San Lorenzo complex.
