= Philip Drucker =

American anthropologist and archaeologist

Philip Drucker (1911–1982) was an American anthropologist and archaeologist who specialized in the Native American peoples of the Northwest Coast of North America. He also played an important part in the early excavations under Matthew Stirling of the Smithsonian of the Olmec culture in Mexico, especially the site of La Venta.

Born in Chicago on January 13, 1911, he began his college career studying animal husbandry at the University of Colorado before switching to Liberal arts and archaeology. He then took further degrees in Anthropology at University of California, Berkeley.

The main Olmec expeditions were in 1940–42 when he worked for the Bureau of American Ethnology in Washington, D.C. His first Olmec period ended when he joined the U.S. Naval Reserve in 1942, seeing active service until 1945. He then joined the Smithsonian but in 1948 he was ordered to active duty by the US Navy Reserve as anthropologist to the American occupation administration for Micronesia, with the rank of Lieutenant-Commander, serving until 1952. From 1955–66 he largely gave up academic work and farmed in Mexico, marrying and having two children. From 1968 he returned to academic life at the University of Kentucky, and elsewhere as a visiting professor.

“One of the best-kept secrets about Philip Drucker is that his adventures as a rancher in southern Veracruz are wonderfully told in the 1969 book Tropical Frontier, which he wrote and published under the pseudonym Paul Record.”

== Bibliography ==
- Drucker, Philip (1965) Cultures of the North Pacific Coast. San Francisco: Chandler Publishing Company.
- Grove, David C. (2014) Discovering the Olmecs: An Unconventional History. Austin: University of Texas Press.
- McFeat, Tom (ed.) (1966) Indians of the North Pacific Coast: Studies in Selected Topics. Toronto: McClelland & Stewart.
- "Smithsonian":Register to the Papers of Philip Drucker, National Anthropological Archives, Smithsonian Institution, with chronology of his life.
