= Neo Ta Memes =

Artwork in Mexico City

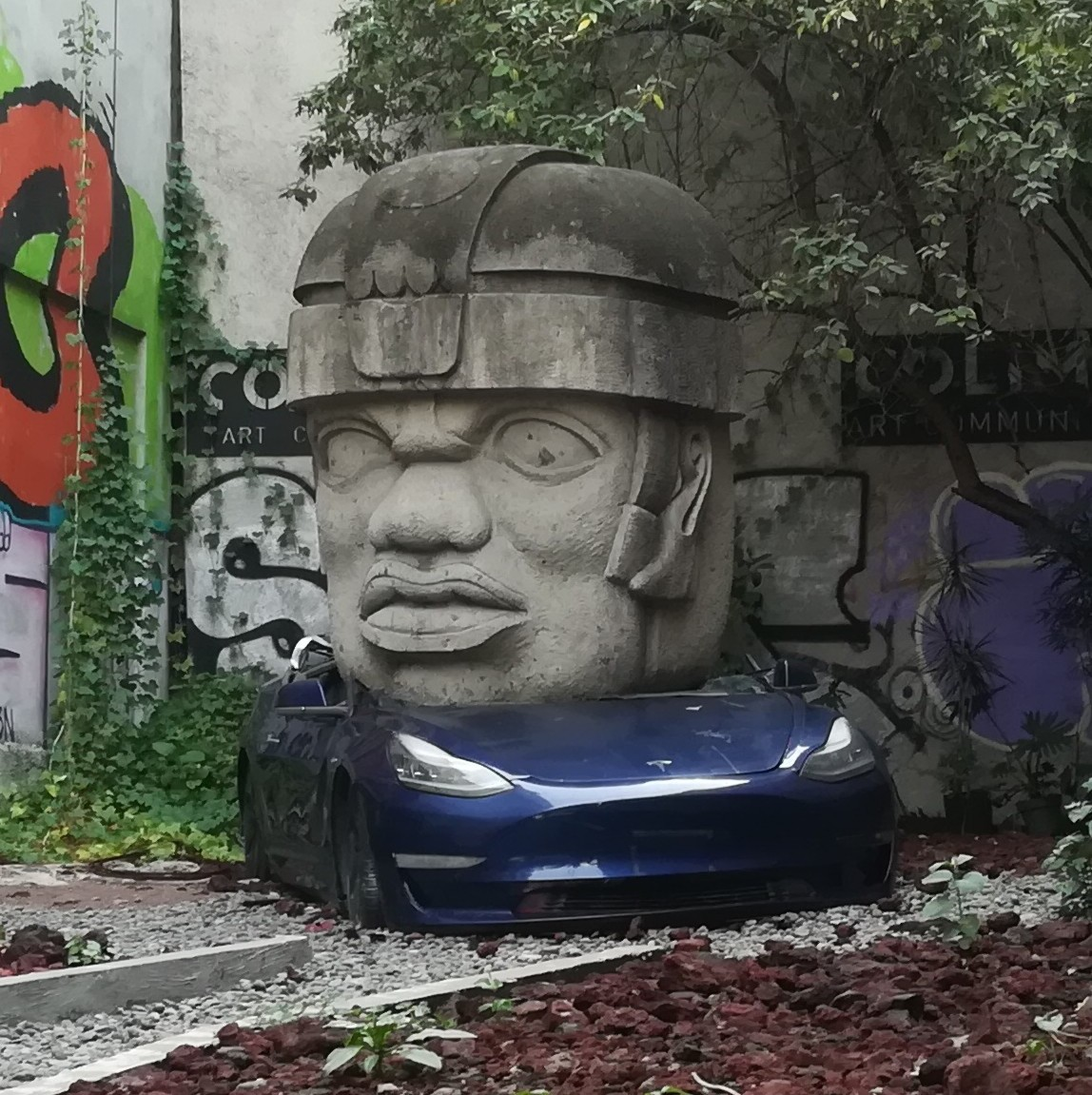
- The artwork in 2026
- Artist: Chavis Mármol
- Year: 2024
- Medium: Quarry stone and a Tesla Model 3
- Location: Mexico City; 19°25′15″N 99°9′24″W
- Website: chavismarmol.com

Neo Ta Memes, (Note: The artwork's name has multiple spellings used by the media. The spelling used here is the one used by the artist.) alternatively named Tesla Crushed by an Olmec Head, is an artwork installed in Colonia Roma, Mexico City. It consists of a re-creation of an Olmec colossal head, crushing a blue Tesla Model 3.

It is a work by Chavis Mármol and forms part of a series of artworks featuring Olmec heads, including a backpack used for food delivery. Neo Ta Memes was installed in March 2024 on a lot donated by an adjacent hotel, which also provided the Tesla. The Olmec head is made of quarry stone. According to the artist, the artwork is a critique of Elon Musk.

== Background ==
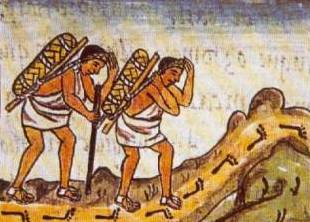
Tamemes according to the Florentine Codex

Neo Ta Memes is a series of artworks by the Mexican artist Chavis Mármol. It includes a backpack shaped like an Olmec colossal head. The backpack was created to honor pre-Hispanic tamemes, people who worked as carriers due to the absence of pack animals. The backpack was used for food deliveries during the COVID-19 pandemic in Mexico, replacing the insulated delivery backpacks commonly used by Uber Eats and Rappi food couriers. It was part of the art installation Intersecciones. Seis aproximaciones a la física de lo posible ('Intersections: Six Approaches to the Physicality of the Possible').

Ana Margarita Ongay, art director at Colima 71 Casa de Arte Hotel, saw the backpack and contacted Mármol. He told her about his idea of crushing a Tesla vehicle with an Olmec head, and she agreed to assist him with the project. Mármol specifically required a Tesla because, according to him, he wanted to "troll" Elon Musk, the owner of Tesla, Inc., who in his view is "a sinister figure".

Mármol was inspired by Still Life with Spirit and Xitle, a similar artwork by Jimmie Durham that featured a 1992 Chrysler Spirit crushed by a volcanic rock with a face painted on it.

== History and installation ==
Neo Ta Memes was installed on a lot along Calle Colima in Colonia Roma, Mexico City, in 2024, next to Colima 71 Casa de Arte Hotel, which collaborated with the artist on the artwork. Neo Ta Memes consists of a blue Tesla Model 3 being crushed by a large replica of an Olmec colossal head.

The entire project took two years to complete. The head is made of quarry stone and took six months to be carved by a team from across the country. The Tesla, valued at around US$40,000, was donated by an unnamed source and provided by the hotel; the batteries were removed to prevent accidents.

On 5 March 2024, the vehicle was placed in the lot, and cranes were used to lift the head, which weighs around 9 metric tons (8.9 long tons; 9.9 short tons), onto the roof of the car, crushing it. The installation was carried out without publicity to "maintain an aura of mystery and generate curiosity".

About the artwork, Mármol said:

The Olmec head imposes itself before the technological object, it bursts and crushes it and in the end it is glorified before this object [... which] is just a product of a capitalist system.

== See also ==
- London vs Musk, a protest event against Elon Musk involving the destruction of a Tesla car
