= Central =

Central is an adjective usually referring to being in the center of some place or (mathematical) object.

Central or The Central may also refer to:

== Directions and generalised locations ==
- Central Africa, a region in the centre of Africa continent, also known as Middle Africa
- Central America, a region in the centre of America continent
- Central Asia, a region in the centre of Eurasian continent
- Central Australia, a region of the Australian continent
- Central Belt, an area in the centre of Scotland
- Central Europe, a region of the European continent
- Central London, the centre of London
- Central Region (disambiguation)
- Central United States, a region of the United States of America

== Specific locations ==
=== Countries ===
- Central African Republic, a country in Africa

=== States and provinces ===
- Blue Nile (state) or Central, a state in Sudan
- Central Department, Paraguay
- Central Province (Kenya)
- Central Province (Papua New Guinea)
- Central Province (Solomon Islands)
- Central Province, Sri Lanka
- Central Province, Zambia

=== Cities and districts ===
==== Jamaica ====
- Saint James Central
- Saint James East Central
- Saint James West Central

==== United Kingdom ====
- Central (Cardiff electoral ward), Wales
- Central (Liverpool ward), England
- Central Region, Scotland, a former local government region

==== United States ====
- Central, Alaska
- Central, Arizona
- Central California
- Central City, Colorado
- Central, Indiana
- Central, Louisiana
- Central, Michigan
- Central, Minnesota, Koochiching County
- Central, Minneapolis, Minnesota
- Central (neighborhood), Minneapolis
- Central Township, Merrick County, Nebraska
- Central, New Mexico
- Central, Cleveland, Ohio
- Central, South Carolina
- Central, Tennessee
- Central, Utah
- Central, West Virginia

==== Other nations ====
- Central District (Botswana)
- Central, Bahia, Brazil
- Central, Hong Kong
  - Central and Western District, Hong Kong
- Central Otago, part of New Zealand's South Island, often known simply as Central
- Central Federal District, a federal district of Russia
- Central Area, Singapore
- Central District Municipality, a district in North West, South Africa
- Central, Zürich, a square in Zürich, Switzerland

=== Electoral districts ===
==== Jamaica ====
- Kingston Central (Jamaica Parliament constituency)
- Saint Andrew East Central (Jamaica Parliament constituency)
- Saint Andrew North Central (Jamaica Parliament constituency)
- Saint Andrew West Central (Jamaica Parliament constituency)
- Saint Catherine West Central (Jamaica Parliament constituency)

==== United Kingdom ====
===== Parliament =====
- Aberdeen Central (UK Parliament constituency)
- Aberdeen Central (Scottish Parliament constituency)
- Barnsley Central (UK Parliament constituency)
- Belfast Central (Northern Ireland Parliament constituency)
- Bradford Central (UK Parliament constituency)
- Brent Central (UK Parliament constituency)
- Cardiff Central (UK Parliament constituency)
- Cardiff Central (Assembly constituency)
- Central Armagh (Northern Ireland Parliament constituency)
- Central Ayrshire (UK Parliament constituency)
- Central Devon (UK Parliament constituency)
- Central Norfolk (UK Parliament constituency)
- Central Suffolk (UK Parliament constituency)
- Central Suffolk and North Ipswich (UK Parliament constituency)
- Croydon Central (UK Parliament constituency)
- Doncaster Central (UK Parliament constituency)
- Ealing Central and Acton (UK Parliament constituency)
- Edinburgh Central (UK Parliament constituency)
- Edinburgh Central (Scottish Parliament constituency)
- Glasgow Central (UK Parliament constituency)
- Greater Manchester Central (European Parliament constituency)
- Hackney Central (UK Parliament constituency)
- Hampshire Central (European Parliament constituency)
- Kingston upon Hull Central (UK Parliament constituency)
- Islington Central (UK Parliament constituency)
- Lancashire Central (European Parliament constituency)
- Leeds Central (UK Parliament constituency)
- London Central (European Parliament constituency)
- Manchester Central (UK Parliament constituency)
- Midlands Central (European Parliament constituency)
- Newcastle upon Tyne Central (UK Parliament constituency)
- Nottingham Central (UK Parliament constituency)
- Sefton Central (UK Parliament constituency)
- Sheffield Central (UK Parliament constituency)
- Southwark Central (UK Parliament constituency)
- Stoke-on-Trent Central (UK Parliament constituency)
- Sunderland Central (UK Parliament constituency)
- York Central (UK Parliament constituency)

===== Local wards =====
- Central ward (multiple articles)

==== Other countries ====
- Central Italy (European Parliament constituency)
- Central constituency (disambiguation), Russia

=== Buildings ===
- The Central, Singapore, a commercial and residential building on Eu Tong Sen Street, Singapore
- The Central Phaholyothin, a commercial and residential building in Bangkok, Thailand

== Companies ==
- Central (home improvement store), a home improvement store chain located in Nova Scotia, Canada
- Central Group, a department store company in Thailand
- Central Trains, a former UK train operating company owned by National Express Group
- ITV Central (formerly Central Independent Television), the ITV company formed from ATV
- London Central, a bus operating company in London owned by Go-Ahead Group

== Education ==
- Central C of E Junior School, a school in the United Kingdom
- North Carolina Central University, a university in Durham, North Carolina, commonly known as "Central"
- Royal Central School of Speech and Drama, a university in London commonly known as "Central"
- Central College (disambiguation)
- Central High School (disambiguation)

== Railways ==
- Central station, a generic name for a centrally located or main station of a town or city
- Central line (London Underground), a London Underground line that runs between West London and East London via Central London
- Central Railway (India)
  - Central line (Mumbai Suburban Railway)
- Central Station (disambiguation), railway stations known by the name "Central"

== Sports ==
- Central (field hockey team), in New Zealand
- Central Córdoba de Santiago del Estero, a football (soccer) club in Argentina
- Central Sport Club, a football (soccer) club in Brazil
- Central United F.C., a football (soccer) club in New Zealand
- Rosario Central, an important football club in Argentina
- União Central Futebol Clube, a football (soccer) club in Brazil

== Other uses ==
- Central (restaurant), in Lima, Peru
- Central (TV channel), a defunct TV channel in Singapore
- Centro (store), formerly Central, a retail chain of the Pantaloon Retail India
- Central Christian Church (Henderson, Nevada), a postdenominational Evangelical megachurch
- Central Music & Entertainment Festival, a music festival in Japan
- Central Police Division, a police division in Singapore
- Central School of Speech and Drama, London
- Central Time Zone, a time zone in the Americas
- Central, a fictional country in the American television sitcom My Name Is Earl
- "Central", a song by John Frusciante from the 2009 studio album The Empyrean
- Cochrane Central Register of Controlled Trials (CENTRAL), see Cochrane Library § Contents
- SBT Central, a television station in Jáu, São Paulo, Brazil

== See also ==
- Central Coast (disambiguation)
- Central District (disambiguation)
- Central Hospital (disambiguation), various hospitals
- Central line (disambiguation)
- Central Valley (disambiguation), multiple valleys with the same name
- Center (disambiguation)
- Tsentralny (disambiguation), places in the former Soviet Union
