= CVHS =

CVHS may refer to:

== Schools ==
- Canyon View High School (disambiguation)
- Central Valley High School (disambiguation)

in Australia

- Canley Vale High School, in Sydney, New South Wales

in the United Kingdom

- Chelmer Valley High School, in Chelmsford, Essex

in the United States

- Capistrano Valley High School, in Mission Viejo, California
- Castle View High School, in Castle Rock, Colorado
- Carnegie Vanguard High School, in Houston, Texas
- Castro Valley High School, in Castro Valley, California
- Centreville High School (Fairfax County, Virginia)
- Chartiers Valley High School, in Bridgeville, Pennsylvania
- Chino Valley High School, in Chino Valley, Arizona
- Chippewa Valley High School, in Clinton Township, Michigan
- Chula Vista High School, in Chula Vista, California
- Clear View High School, in Webster, Texas
- Clearwater Valley High School, in Kooskia, Idaho
- Cleveland High School (North Carolina)
- Coachella Valley High School, in Thermal, California
- Conestoga Valley High School, in Lancaster, Pennsylvania
- Crescent Valley High School, in Corvallis, Oregon
- Crescenta Valley High School, in La Crescenta, California
- Campo Verde High School, in Gilbert, Arizona
