= Alejandro Ruiz Olmedo =

Mexican chef (born 1970)

- Born: Alejandro Ruiz Olmedo; 1970 (age 55–56); Oaxaca
- Occupation: chef

Alejandro Ruiz Olmedo (born 1970) is a Mexican chef. He is recognized for representing the gastronomy of Oaxaca and for promoting Oaxacan cuisine around the world.

== Career ==
In 1997, he created Casa Oaxaca, a small hotel with a restaurant and later two more restaurants in the city of Oaxaca.

In 2008, his restaurant received the first Five Star Diamond Award as one of the 50 best restaurants in Mexico, an award he won in 2008, 2009 and 2010.

In 2011, one of his restaurants was named the best hotel restaurant at the Gourmet Awards Mexico.

In 2012, the Éditions Larousse included him in the publication of the book "Las mejores recetas de los Top Chefs de México" (The best recipes of the Top Chefs of Mexico).

In 2013, his Oaxaca hotel was awarded number 34 on the list of Latin America's 50 Best Restaurants, a list produced by The World's 50 Best Restaurants.

In 2014, Food and Travel Reader Awards recognizes it as the best restaurant in the interior of Mexico and won in 2014, 2015 and 2016.

In 2017, it was awarded best hotel restaurant in the Travel and Leisure Gourmet Awards, and in 2018 it was awarded best local restaurant.

In 2018, he published his first book "Alejandro Ruiz, Cocina de Oaxaca", which received the García Cubas 2018 award. In December the magazine Quien awarded him a recognition in its 2018 edition as one of the 50 people who are transforming Mexico.
