= Central Time =

Central Time may refer to a time zone in the middle of some region:

- Central Time Zone, in North America (CST = UTC−06:00; CDT = UTC−05:00)
- Central European Time (CET = UTC+01:00; Central European Summer Time [CEST] / Central European Daylight Time [CEDT] = UTC+02:00)
- Central Africa Time (CAT = UTC+02:00)
- Central Indonesian Time (Indonesian: Waktu Indonesia Tengah, WITA), UTC+08:00 — see time in Indonesia
- Time in Australia § Australian Central Standard Time (ACST) – UTC+09:30 (ACDT/CDST = UTC+10:30)

== See also ==
- Central (disambiguation)
