= La Carta de Oaxaca =

Mexican restaurant in Seattle, Washington, U.S.

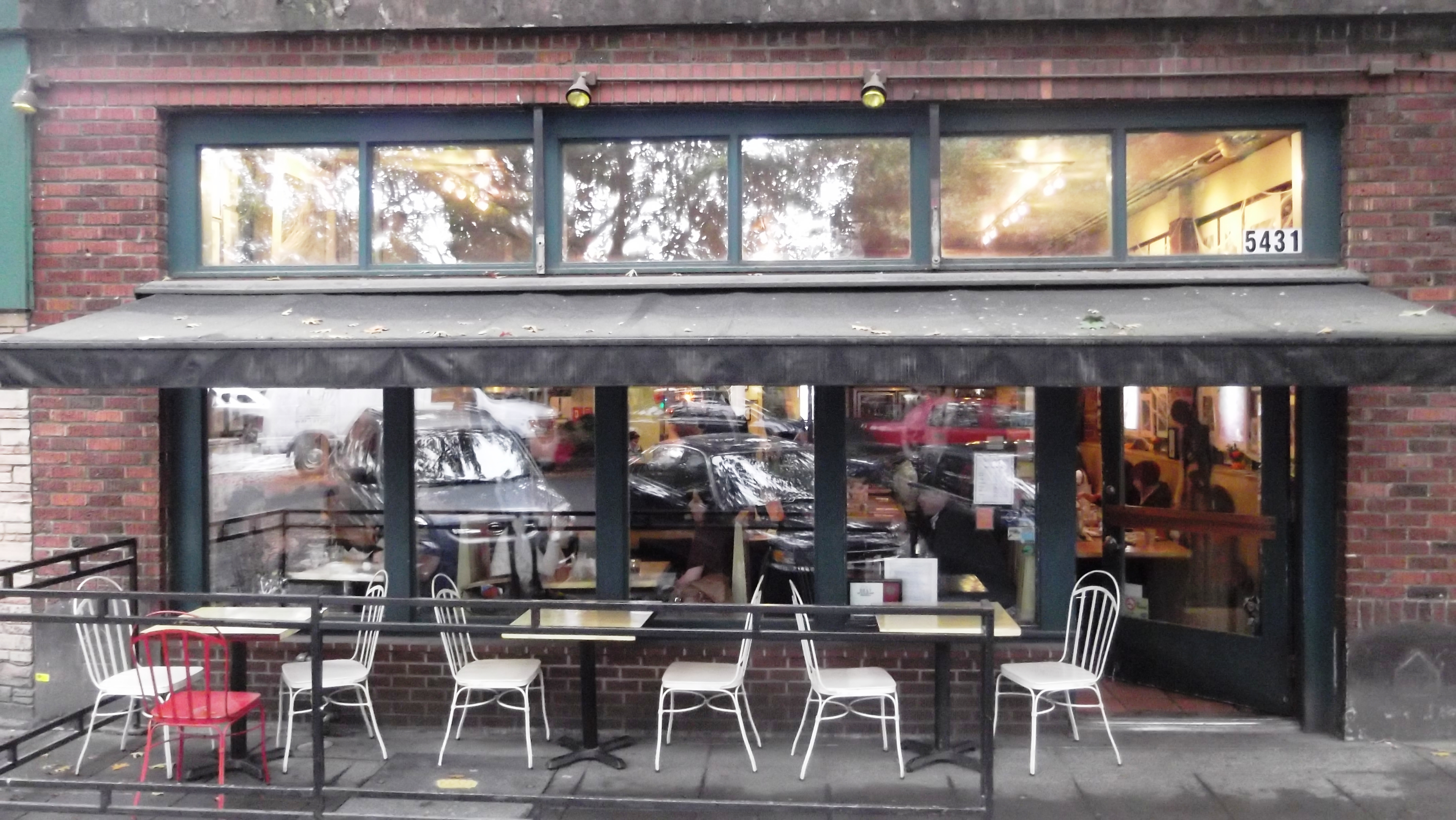
- The restaurant's exterior, 2012
- Interactive map of La Carta de Oaxaca

Restaurant information
- Established: 2003
- Food type: Mexican (Oaxacan)
- Location: 5431 Ballard Avenue NW, Seattle, Washington, 98107, United States
- Coordinates: 47°40′5.1″N 122°23′9″W

La Carta de Oaxaca is a Mexican restaurant in Seattle's Ballard neighborhood, in the U.S. state of Washington.

== Description ==
La Carta de Oaxaca is a Latino-owned Mexican restaurant specializing in Oaxacan cuisine in Seattle's Ballard neighborhood. The menu has included tacos al pastor, ceviche with pineapple, lamb birria, mole negro over pork ribs, and tlayudas with chorizo, carne asada, cheese, and cabbage as toppings. The restaurant also serves cocktails and has selections of mezcal and tequila.

== History ==
The restaurant opened in 2003. El Mezcalito (formerly Mezcaleria Oaxaca) in the Queen Anne neighborhood has been described as a sibling restaurant.

La Carta de Oaxaca celebrated its tenth anniversary by offering a week-long happy hour.

== Reception ==
Julien Perry included the restaurant in Eater Seattle's 2013 overview of "The Essential 38 Seattle Restaurants". Maggy Lehmicke included La Carta de Oaxaca in the website's 2020 list of "13 Fun Bachelorette Party Destinations in Seattle", writing: "Every girls trip means a call for quality tacos, which is exactly what you’ll find at this Mexican joint in Ballard. Not only are the dishes satisfying (the mole is maybe the best in the city), but the dishes are easy on the wallet."

In 2018, the restaurant was voted the best Mexican restaurant in Seattle Magazine's annual readers' poll. Seattle Metropolitan included the business in 2022 lists of "Seattle’s 100 Best Restaurants" and "Seattle’s Great Tacos and Mexican Restaurants".

== See also ==
- List of Mexican restaurants
