= Rodolfo Castellanos =

Mexican chef (born 1980)

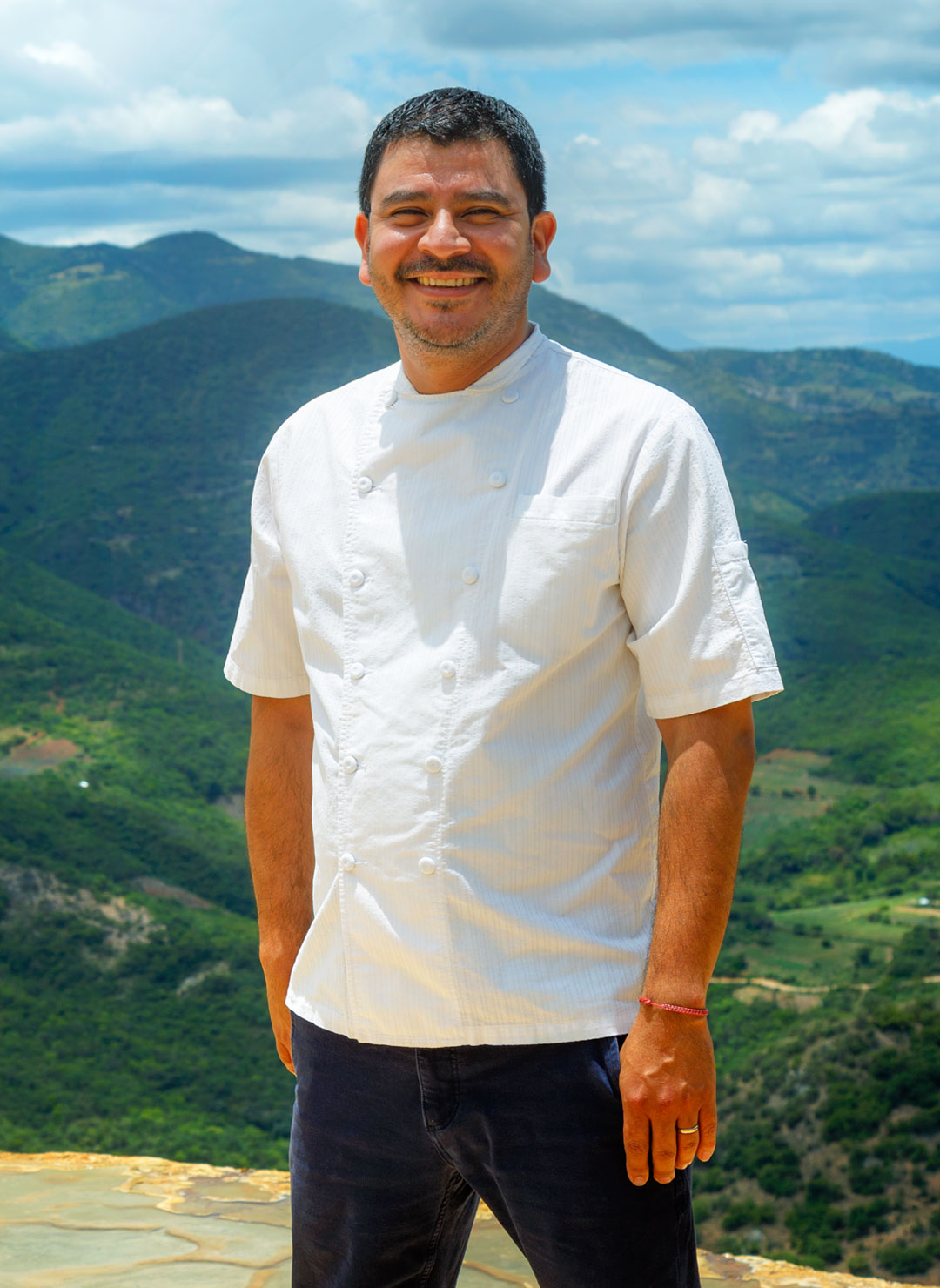
- Born: Rodolfo Castellanos; 1980 (age 45–46); Oaxaca, Mexico
- Occupation: chef

Rodolfo Castellanos (born 1980) is a Mexican chef. He is recognized as the first winner of Top Chef Mexico.

== Career ==
In 2011, he created Origen, a contemporary restaurant in the city of Oaxaca where he reinterprets Oaxacan cuisine.

In 2016, he is awarded as the winner of the first season of Top Chef Mexico, a reality television series that Sony Channel produces for Latin America.
