= Canyon View =

Canyon View may refer to:

== Schools ==
- Canyon View High School (disambiguation)
- Canyon View Middle School
