= Central Singapore =

Central Singapore may refer to the following places in Singapore:

- Central Singapore Community Development Council
- Central Region, Singapore
  - Category:Central Region, Singapore
- Central Area, Singapore (AKA City Area or The City)
- Central Police Division (the 'A' Division)
- Central Expressway, Singapore
- Central Catchment Area (AKA Central Water Catchment)

== See also ==
- Bukit Batok Central, a subzone of Bt Batok, in the eastern part of the West Region
- Nee Soon Central Single Member Constituency (1988–2011)
- Balestier Central, the 1996–2002 name of the football (soccer) club based in Toa Payoh, now known as Balestier Khalsa FC
- Central Provident Fund (CPF), a savings and pension plan
- Central (disambiguation)
