= Oaxacan cuisine =

Regional cuisine of Oaxaca, Mexico

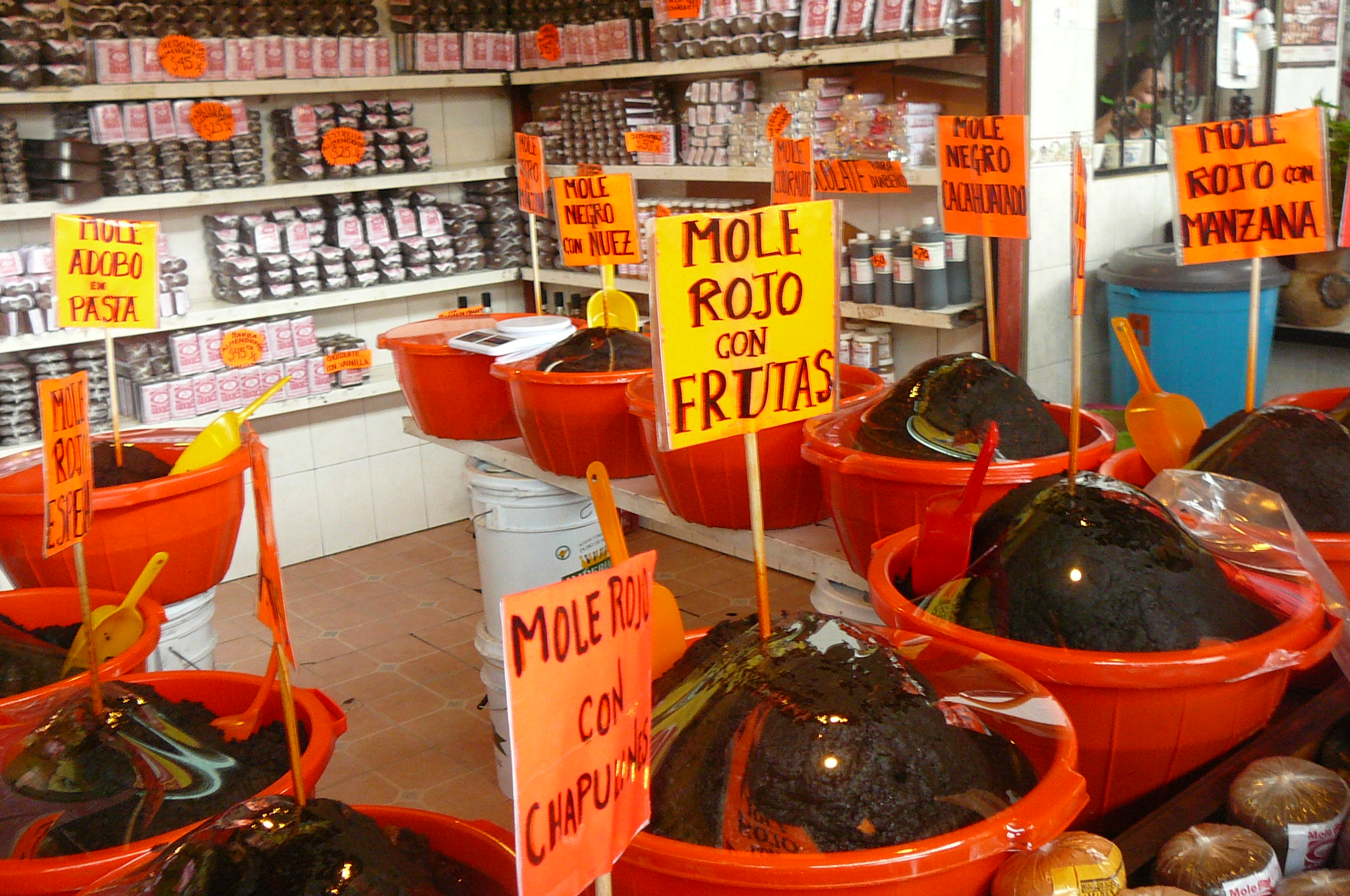
Store selling various Oaxacan moles

Oaxacan cuisine is a regional cuisine of Mexico, centered on the city of Oaxaca, the capital of the eponymous state located in southern Mexico. Oaxaca is one of the country's major gastronomic, historical, and gastro-historical centers whose cuisine is known internationally. Like the rest of Mexican cuisine, Oaxacan food is based on staples such as corn, beans, and chile peppers, but there is a great variety of other ingredients and food preparations due to the influence of the state's varied geography and indigenous cultures. Corn and many beans were first cultivated in Oaxaca. Well-known features of the cuisine include ingredients such as chocolate (often drunk in a hot preparation with spices and other flavourings), Oaxaca cheese, mezcal, and grasshoppers (chapulines), with dishes such as tlayudas, Oaxacan-style tamales, and seven notable varieties of mole sauce. The cuisine has been praised and promoted by food experts such as Diana Kennedy and Rick Bayless and is part of the state's appeal for tourists.

== Distinctions ==
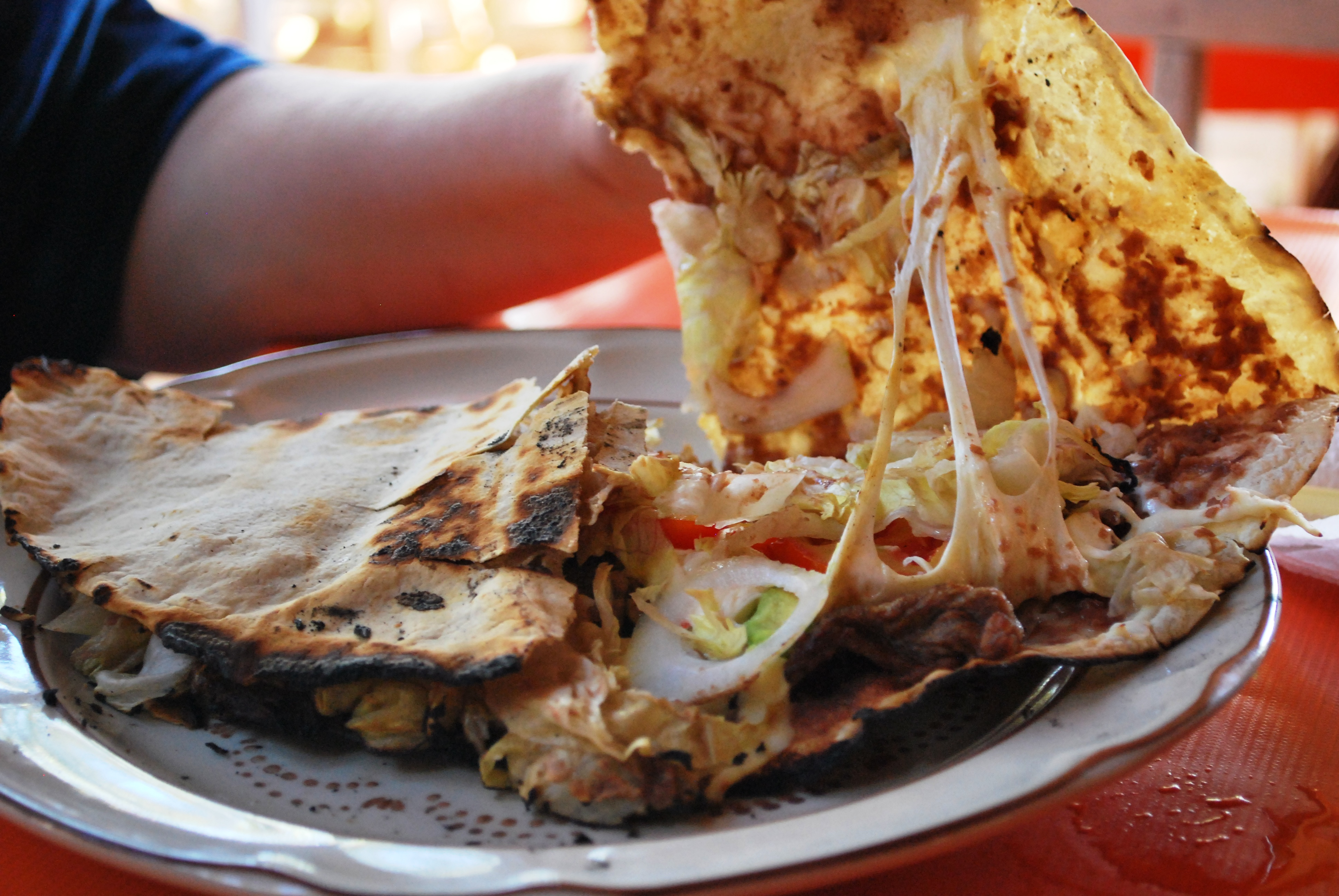
Tlayuda with meat, cheese, and more served in Mazunte.

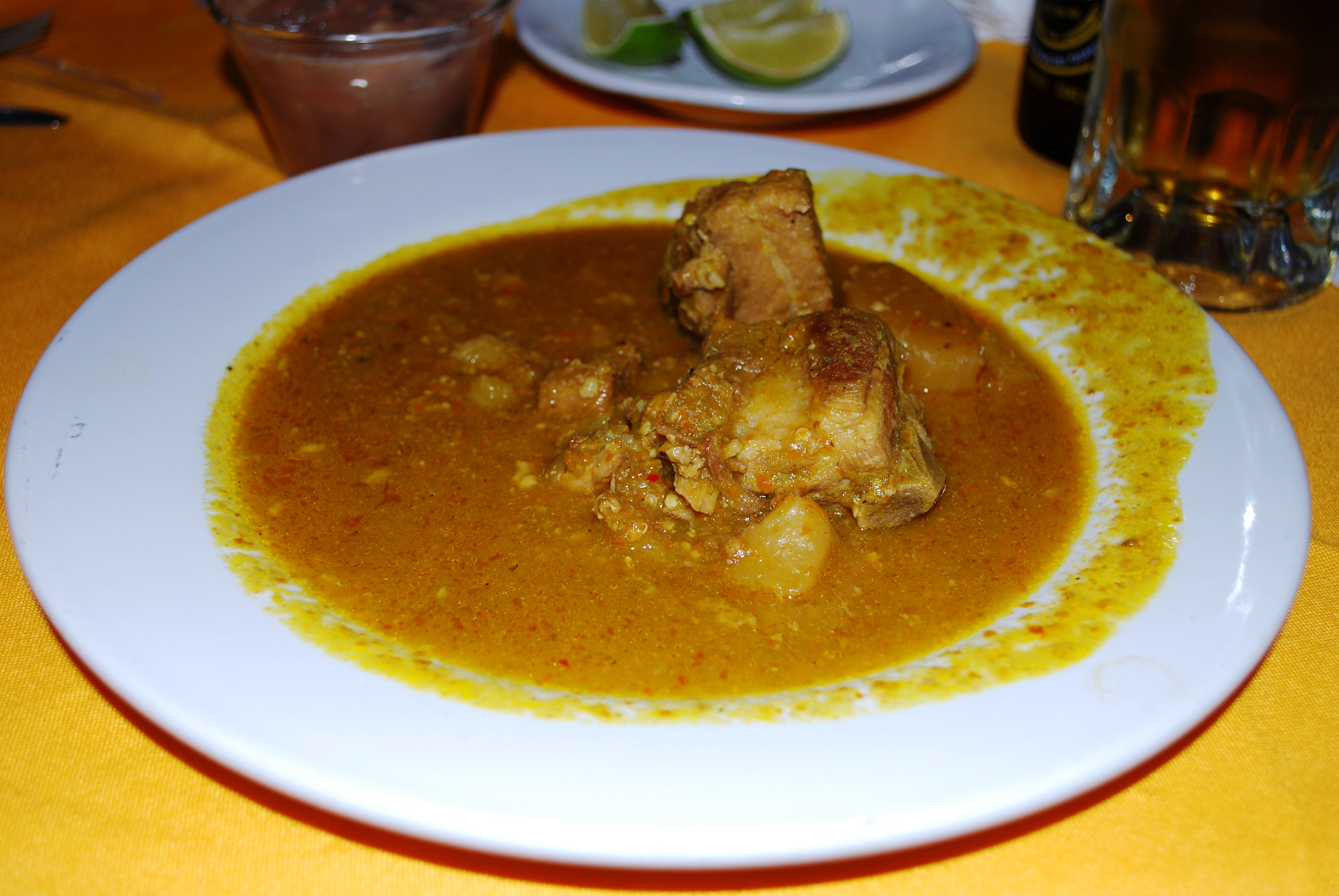
Chileajo, a mole regional to Huajuapan de León.

Because of its mountain ranges, the state has a number of climates and cultures, which contributes to making the cuisine the most varied in Mexico. The state has coastal areas with seafood, the Central Valley region grows a wide variety of vegetables, and the area near Veracruz provides a year-round supply of tropical fruits. It also has seventeen recognized indigenous groups, which contribute their own cooking traditions. The cooking of each region in the state is characterized by local ingredients and, to some extent, cooking methods. One example is that of the Triques, who are known for their pit barbecuing. However, despite its rich culinary tradition, Oaxaca is a poor state and many struggle to eat decently.

Oaxaca's dietary staple is corn, which has been Mexico's for over 7,000 years. Corn is generally dried and ground to create a dough, which is used for a number of dishes, including entomatadas, empanadas, and tamales. Tortillas are called blandas and are a part of nearly every meal. The main flavoring agent is the chili pepper, with varieties such as amarillos, chilhuacles, chilcostles, and costeños, but the most distinctive is the pasilla oaxaqueña chile. Characteristic herbs include hoja santa, often used in chicken, pork, and fish dishes as well as mole verde, along with epazote and pitiona. Two well-known aspects of the cuisine are the use of chocolate for drinking and various edible insects, especially grasshoppers called chapulines (see below). Lesser-known regional specialties include ice cream flavored with rose petals, and squash flowers found in empanadas, quesadillas, soups, and more.

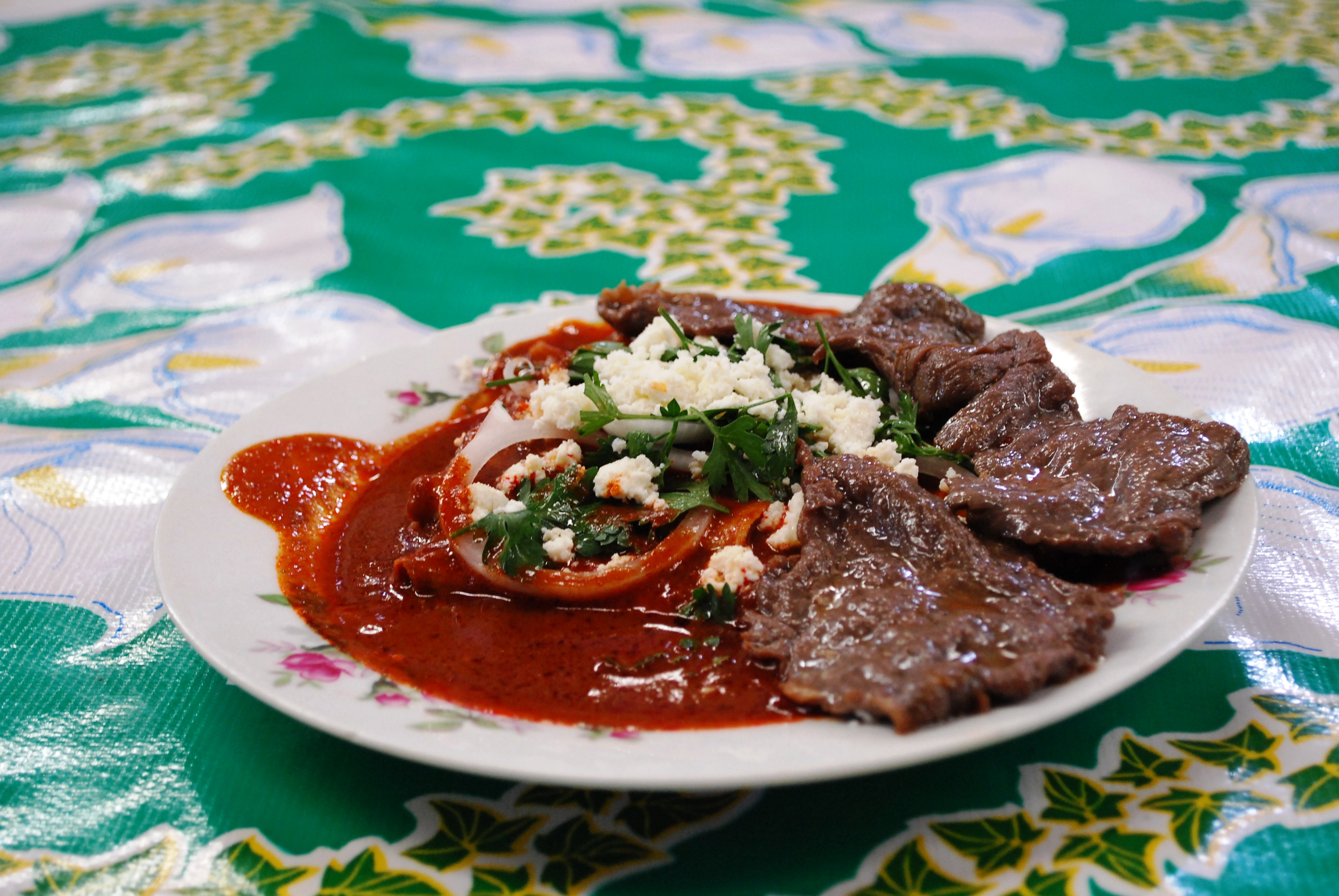
Enchiladas with tasajo beef

As for beans, Oaxacan cuisine prefers black beans in many varieties: cooked with aniseed and served in the form of soup, as a topping for street food, or with scrambled eggs in huevos con frijoles.

Another distinctive ingredient is Oaxaca cheese, also called quesillo, used to make empanadas, tortas, and tlayudas.

Oaxacan cooking varies region by region, but a number of dishes can be found in nearly all parts of the state. Tlayudas are large chewy tortillas with toppings of beans, guacamole, meat or seafood, and cheese. The most traditional Oaxacan tamales are large, wrapped in banana leaves with a mole filling. Other tamale varieties include amarillo (yellow), verde (green), rajas (chili pepper strips), chepil, elote (fresh corn), and dulce (sweet). In the Isthmus of Tehuantepec, there is a variation with iguana meat and, along the coast, it can contain seafood. Oaxaca is famous for its chocolate, traditionally hand-ground and combined with almonds, cinnamon, and other ingredients, usually drunk as a hot beverage. Other well-known Oaxacan dishes include chorizo oaxaqueño, tasajo, cecina enchilada, cocido oaxaqueño, and various sauces such as molcajete, chintextle, borracha, chile pasilla, guajillo y ajo, and gusanitos. Besides chocolate, other typical drinks include mezcal, various types of atole, champurrado, and various fruit-based drinks.

== Central Valleys region ==
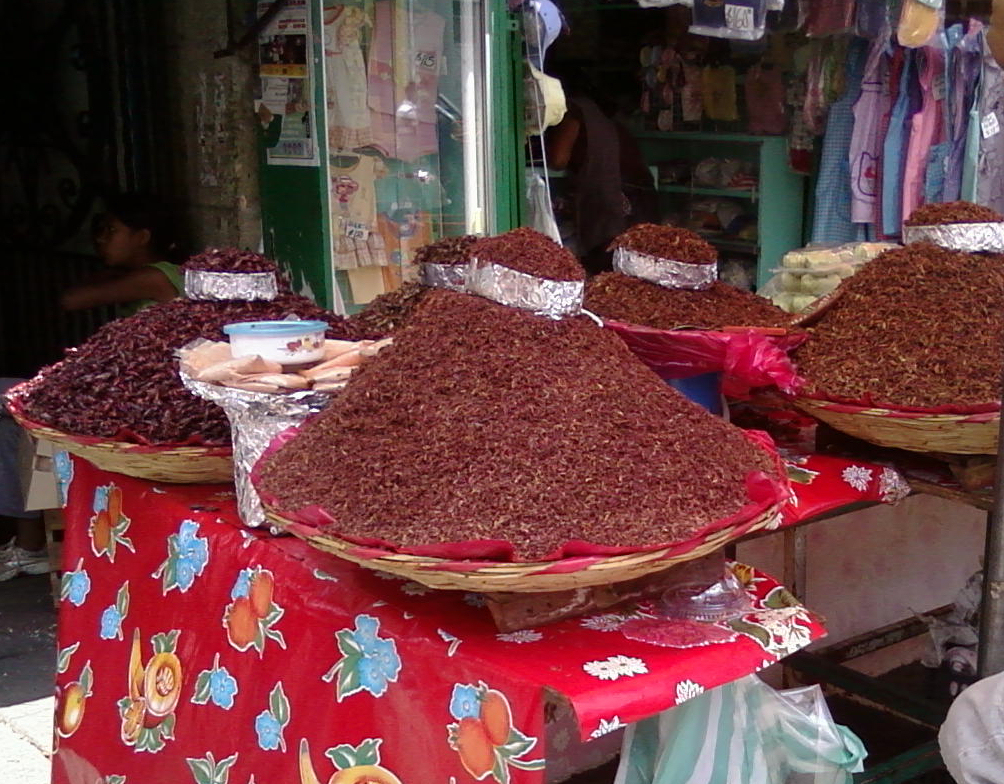
Chapulines for sale at a market

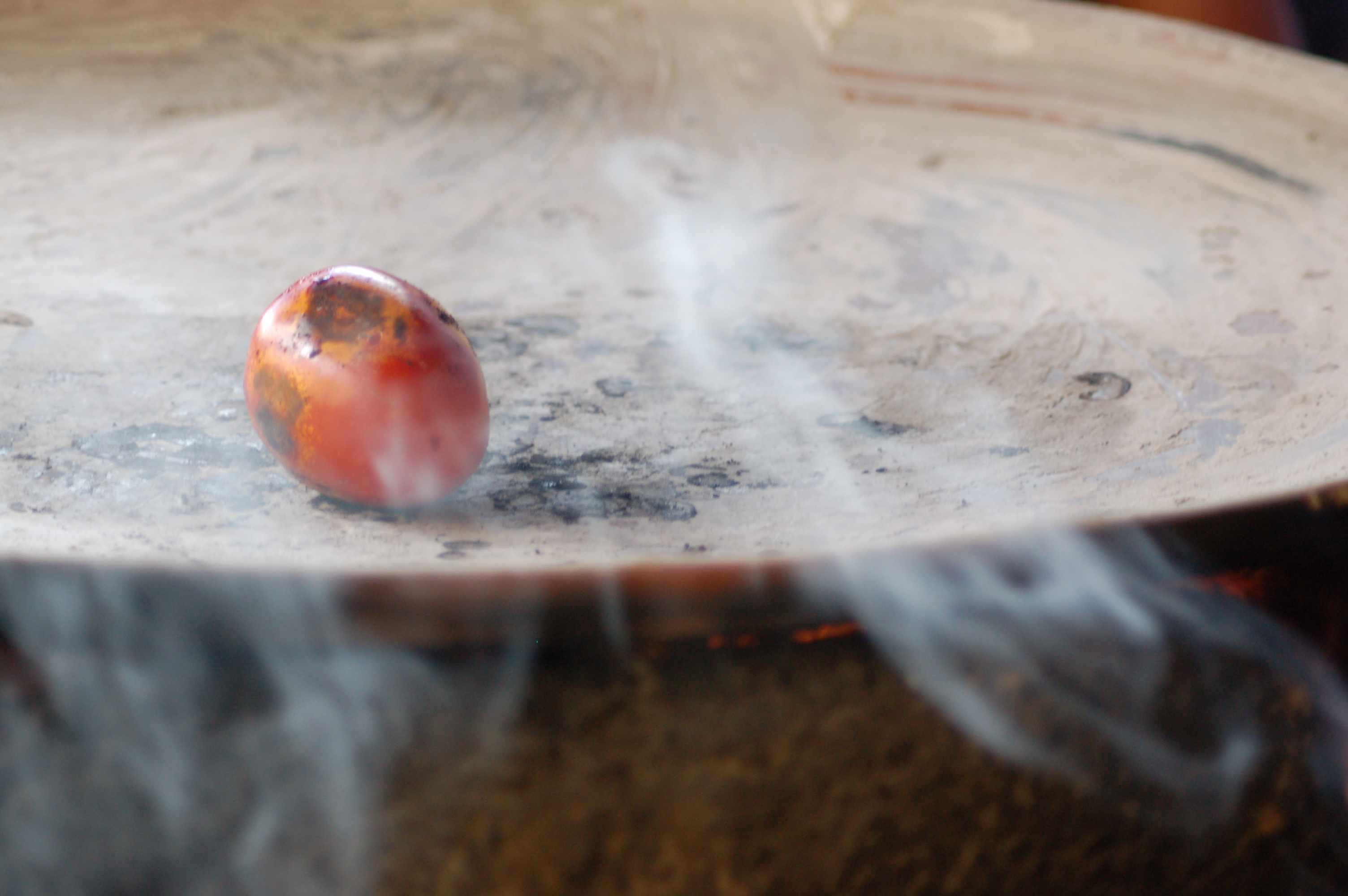
Tomato roasting on a clay comal

The culinary center of the state is its capital of the same name, Oaxaca, located in what is called the Central Valleys region. While the dominant indigenous group here has been the Zapotecs since the pre-Hispanic period, there has been influence from other groups as well, such as the Mixtecs. The people of Oaxaca have grown corn, beans, squash, and other crops for thousands of years. In rural, especially indigenous, villages, households still depend heavily on these foods with few changes in how they are grown, mostly on small plots. The cooking here retains much of its indigenous flavour, such as dishes prepared without fat (unknown before the arrival of the Spanish) and the use of the valley's abundance of vegetables and herbs, especially in its moles. However, as capital of the state, it also received influence from other parts of Oaxaca.

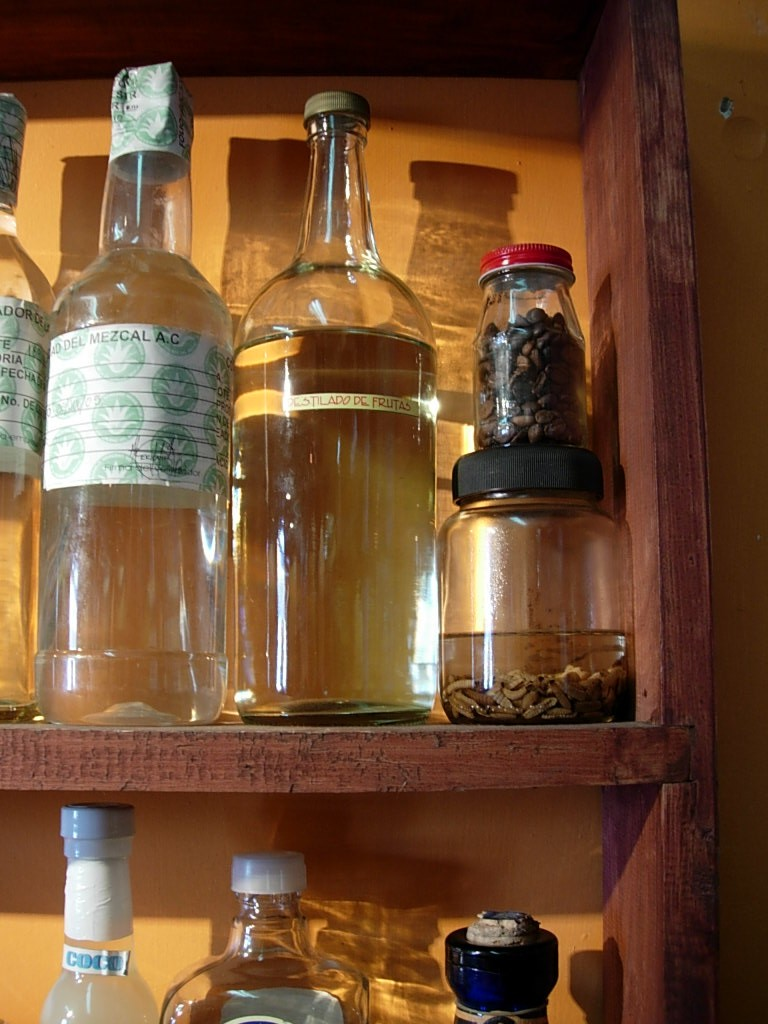
Bottles of mezcal

The best-known mezcal-producing area of the state is here, between the city of Oaxaca and Mitla, along the highway that leads to the Isthmus of Tehuantepec. Like tequila, mezcal is made with the cooked hearts of a species of the maguey or agave plant, but the flavour is very different. It has been described as smoky, and it is usually drunk straight. It comes in several varieties and can contain flavours such as almond, coffee, and orange. A related traditional drink is aguamiel, the non-alcoholic sap of the maguey plant.

Much of this area's cuisine can be experienced in its many markets, both in the wide variety of ingredients for sale as well as pre-prepared foods to eat. All markets have areas with food stands. One of the best known of these is the 20 de Noviembre market, filled with food stands that prepare everything from various moles to hot chocolate with pan de yema bread. It also includes a section specializing in meats such as tasajo and chorizo cooked to order and eaten with large corn tortillas, guacamole, and various grilled and fresh vegetables.

Despite the Central Valley's geographic remoteness, the area is one of Mexico's culinary capitals, with its food praised and promoted by food experts such as Alice Waters, Rick Bayless, Susana Trilling, and Diana Kennedy. This promotion has helped to support the area's tourism industry, with people coming to experience the food. One attraction gaining more attention is the “Food of the Gods Festival” in the capital city. In addition to food tastings, there are cooking classes taught by local chefs. Also available are wine and mezcal tasting, chocolate making, a coffee-mill tour, and tours to archeological sites and local crafts villages. A number of professional chefs are now based in the city of Oaxaca. This urban centre has a number of upscale restaurants such as La Biznaga and Los Danzantes, run by professional chefs, but they all work to blend Oaxacan with contemporary cooking. They also all rely on local markets and farms for their ingredients. Susana Trilling is an author, chef, and television host who runs the Seasons of My Heart cooking school in Oaxaca.

== Chocolate ==
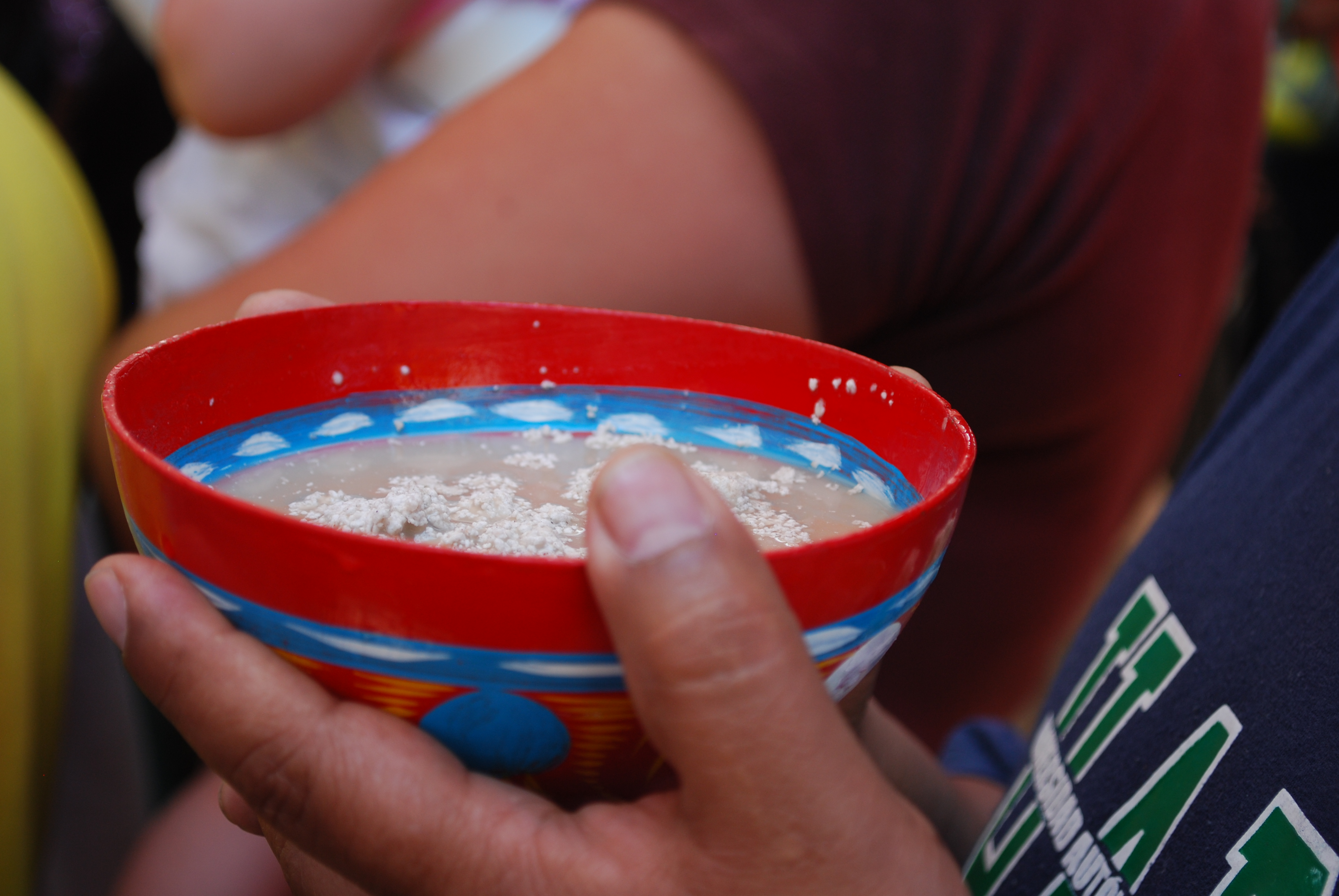
Tejate served in a painted gourd bowl/cup in Zaachila.

Oaxaca is an important producer and exporter of coffee, but the more important drink is chocolate. Oaxaca is one of the Mexican states that produces cacao, along with Veracruz, Tabasco, Chiapas, Morelos, Guerrero, and Michoacán. Cacao and chocolate have been used in the state as food, drink, and medicine. In the past, the cacao beans served as a form of money.

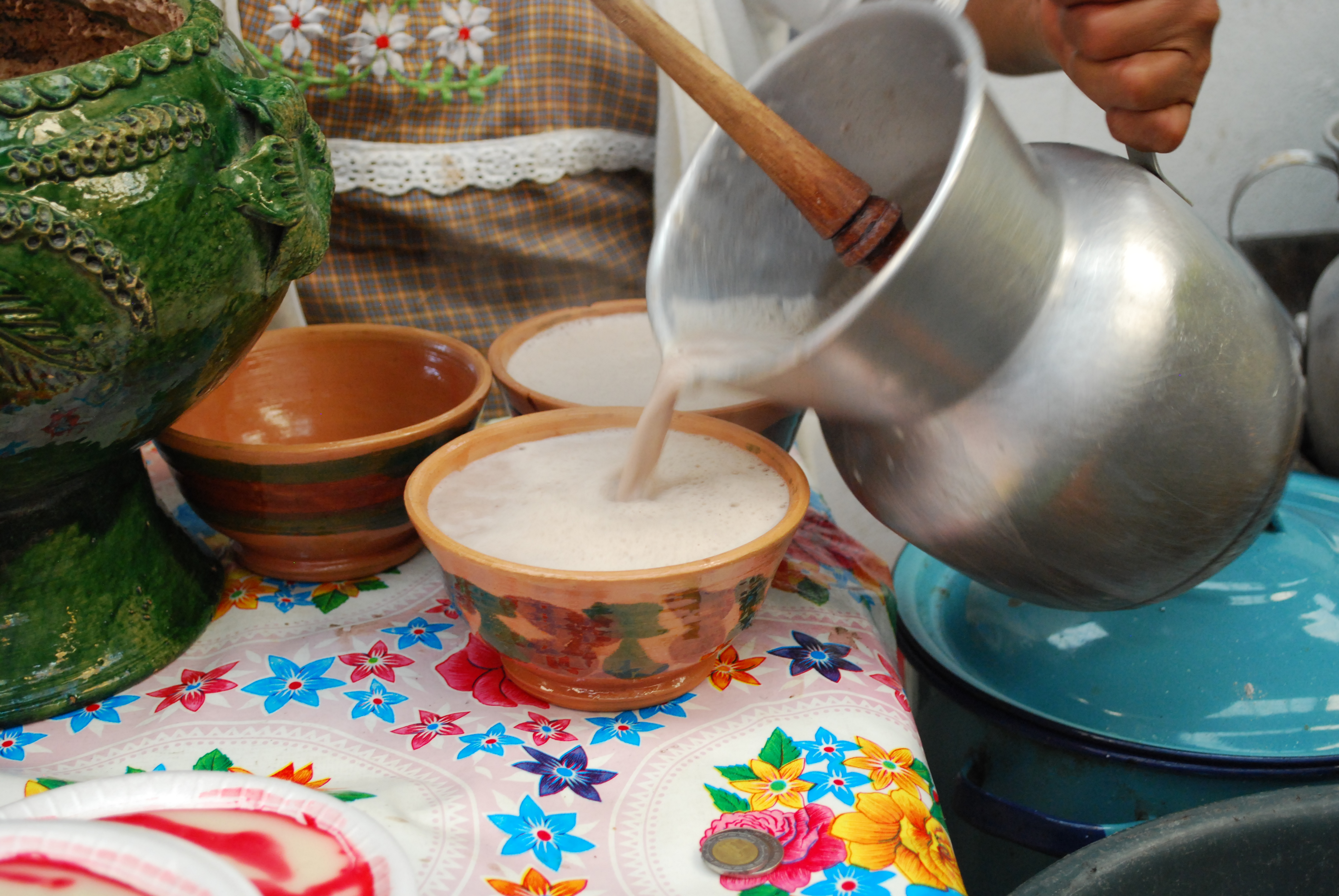
Woman pouring chocolate and milk at a stand in the municipal market in Villa de Etla.

In the center of the city of Oaxaca, various businesses grind and prepare cacao for hot chocolate drinks, moles, and more. The best known of these businesses is El Mayordomo. Inside, their large mills grind beans that are then mixed with sugar and other flavourings such as almonds and cinnamon. Most of the cacao is processed for drinking. Hot chocolate is prepared with the chocolate mixture, corn flour and water or milk, heated in a pot or pitcher. Before serving, a froth is created using a special instrument, which is twirled rapidly by rubbing the handles between the palms. The resulting cacao beverage containing the froth is named pozonque. The Oaxacan pan de yema, 'egg yolk bread', a type of pan dulce, is typically eaten with the pozonque hot chocolate drink.

Though most chocolate is consumed as a hot drink, it is also an important ingredient in a cold beverage called tejate, typical to Oaxaca. The preparation is made with fermented corn, cacao, and the seed of the mamey fruit. It is traditionally served in dried and painted gourds. Tejate is usually found in the towns just outside the city of Oaxaca. It is similar to the pozol of Chiapas. The drink was previously considered a complete meal. However, tejate is becoming less common and harder to find.

== Seven moles ==
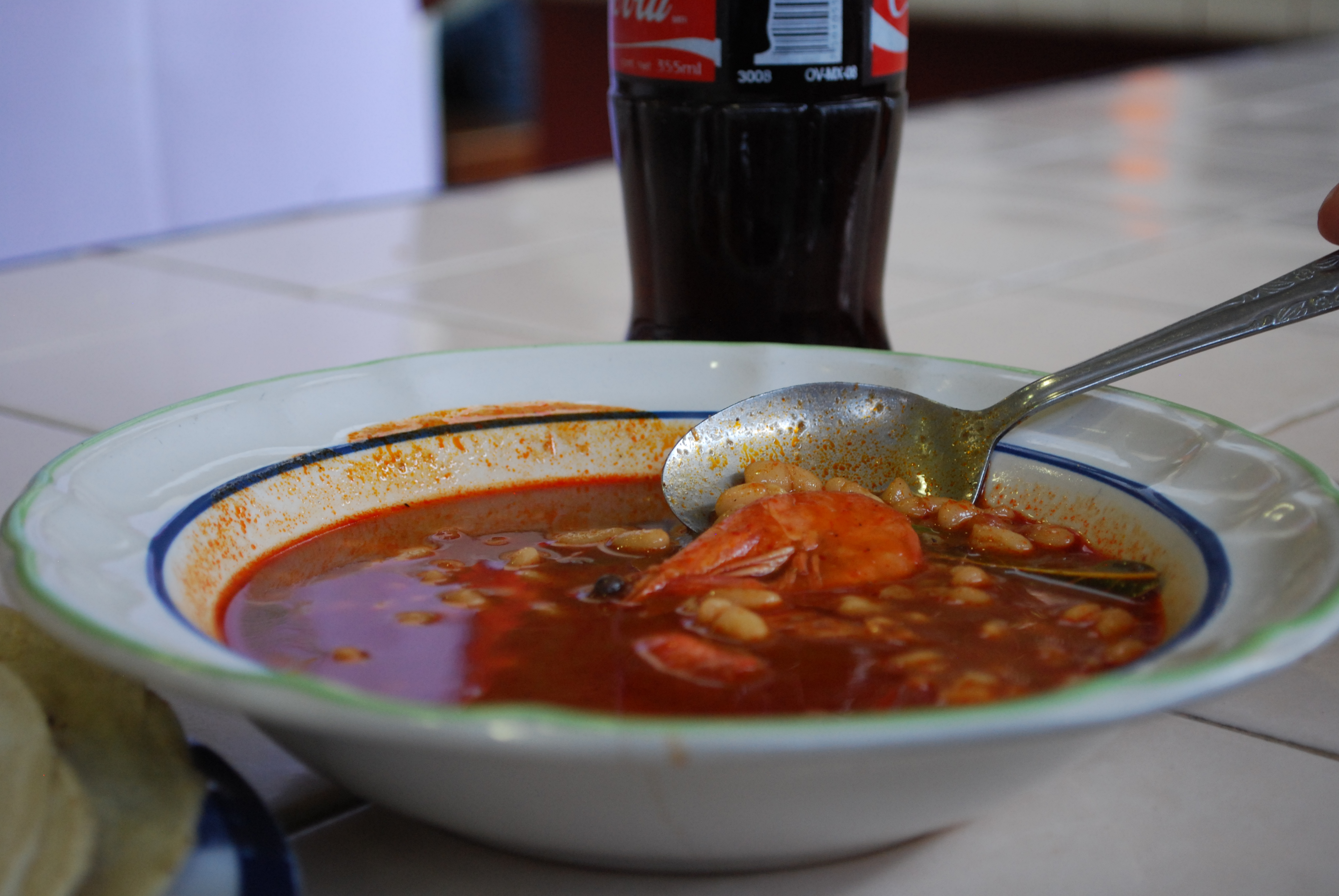
White beans and shrimp in mole coloradito at the 20 de Noviembre market

Oaxaca has over two hundred known preparations for mole, a complicated sauce based on one or more chili peppers. However, seven are most notable, giving the state the nickname of “land of the seven moles”. Oaxacan moles require multiple ingredients and long cooking times, and for this reason are traditionally served only for special occasions. Ingredients for moles were traditionally prepared ground on a metate; today, however, they are usually made with the help of blenders and food mills, which grind and mix many of the ingredients. Depending on what is put in a mole, the ingredients are toasted or fried, then mixed with others to make a sauce which is then simmered. Recipes vary from cook to cook. While chocolate is used in two of the seven moles, it is not the most important ingredient. Oaxacan moles are served with chicken, pork, and beef; however, the sauce is more important in a mole dish than the meat.

The name, colour, and ingredients distinguish the seven main moles of Oaxaca, called negro (black), amarillo (yellow), coloradito (little red or red-coloured), mancha manteles (tablecloth stainer), chichilo (named after the main pepper), rojo (red), and verde (green). All of the moles, except for verde, can be kept as a paste and cooked later, diluted with chicken broth. Mole negro is the best known and most complicated of the preparations, containing anywhere from twenty to thirty-plus ingredients, depending on the recipe. Mole negro is slightly sweet, black in colour, and contains six different types of chili peppers, plantains, onion, tomatoes, tomatillos, cloves, cinnamon, chocolate, nuts, tortillas, avocado leaves, and more depending on the recipe. To gain the desired black colour, the chili peppers have to be well toasted but not burnt. Mole amarillo contains green tomatoes, onion, garlic, cumin, cloves, ancho chili peppers, guajillo chili peppers, and hoja santa or cilantro, and is garnished with onions, lime, and oregano. Mole coloradito is brick-red in colour and contains ancho chili peppers, tomatoes, garlic, sesame seeds, almonds, cinnamon, and oregano. Mancha manteles is red and uses ancho chili peppers, tomatoes, garlic, onion, thyme, cloves, and almonds. Another red mole is chichilo, which uses chihuacle, negro, pasilla, and mulato chile peppers, tomatoes, marjoram, allspice, cloves, and avocado leaves. Rojo is red, as its name suggests, with ingredients such as chocolate, guajillo chili peppers, onion, tomatoes, garlic, oregano, nuts, and sesame seeds. Mole verde contains tomatillos, green chili peppers, onion, garlic, cumin, cloves, ancho, and guajillo chili peppers, hoja santa, epazote, and parsley. It has a light and herby taste. Of the sauces, verde is the easiest to create, as it does not require the toasting and rehydration of chili peppers.

== Chapulines ==
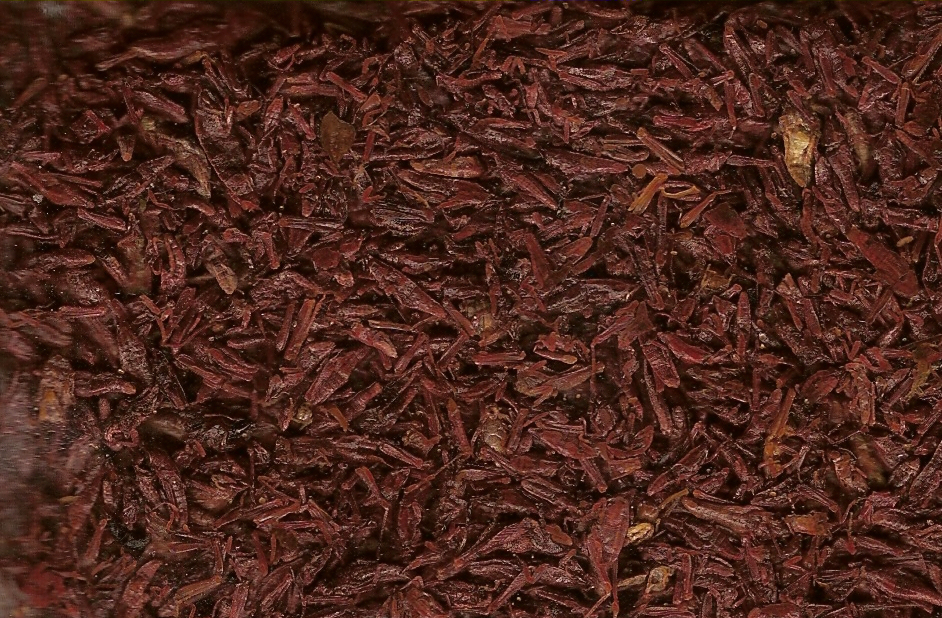
Young chapulines

Various insects are consumed in the state, including ants and grubs from maguey plants, but the best-known of these is grasshoppers, called chapulines. Although eaten in other parts of Mexico, chapulines are most popular in the Central Valleys area of Oaxaca. They are an important source of protein in the rural areas and a delicacy in Oaxaca city. They have been eaten since well before the arrival of the Spanish, and generally serve as a condiment or snack food and sometimes the main dish. Their preparation and sale is a full-time occupation for many and an important source of income for a lot of rural families. They are even shipped to the United States.

Grasshoppers that are consumed are collected from corn and alfalfa fields. They are semi-domesticated, living longer and reproducing at higher rates than those living in wild areas. The harvest season for the insects is during the rainy season, from late spring to early winter. This time begins with the hatching of new grasshoppers, called nymphs in English, which taste sweet, commanding a premium price. Older grasshoppers tend to have a slightly bitter taste.

Clean grasshoppers are cooked by immersing them in boiling water seasoned with garlic and lime. The most common way to eat them is fresh off the comal and with a tortilla, but they are also consumed fried with chili powder as a snack (especially with mezcal) and can be found in more sophisticated preparations, in a sauce or mixed with eggs.
