= Kesong puti =

Filipino soft carabao's milk cheese

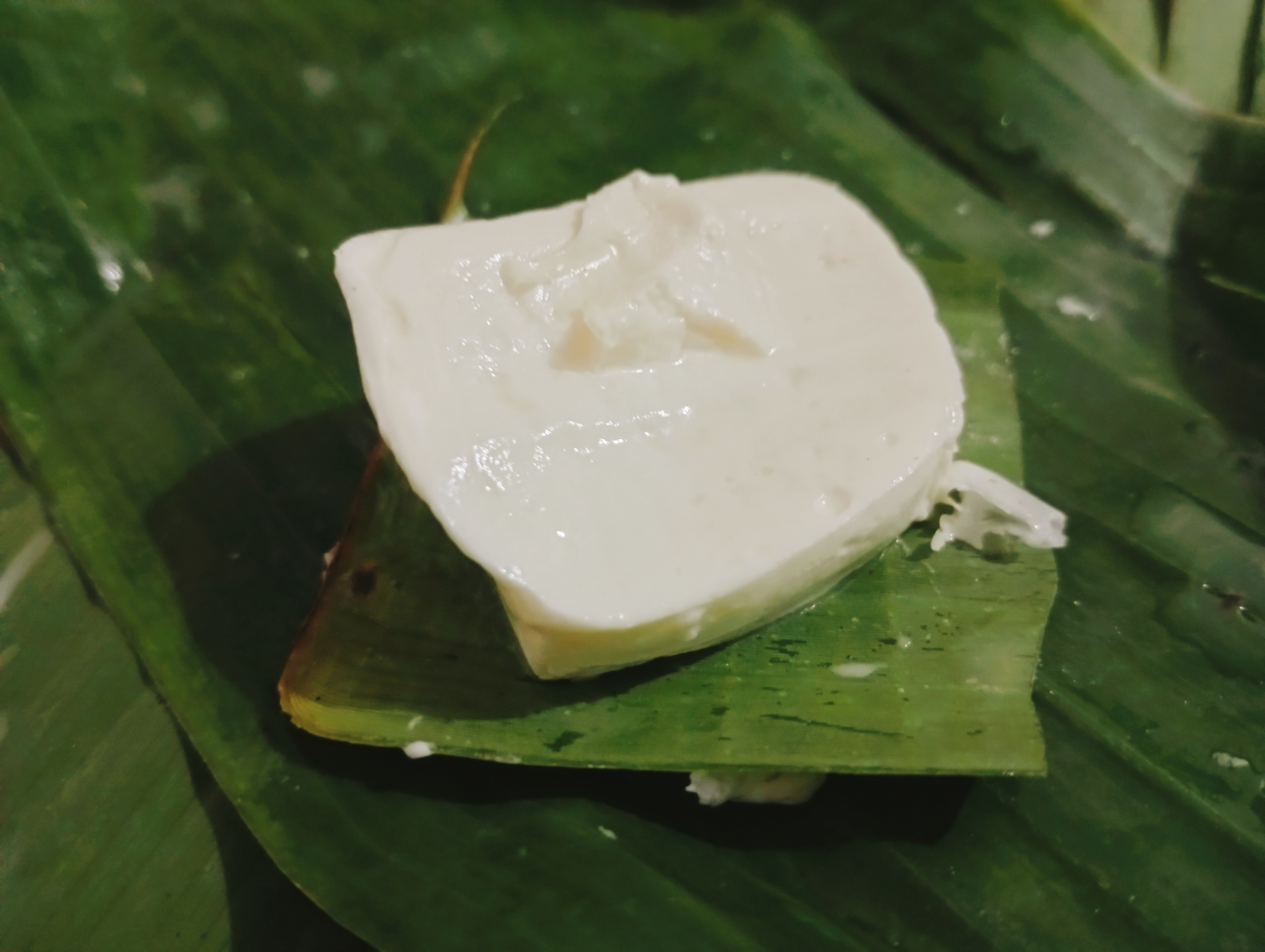
- Country of origin: Philippines
- Source of milk: Carabao, Goat, Cow
- Pasteurised: Yes
- Texture: Soft
- Aging time: None

Kesong putî is a Filipino soft, unaged, white cheese made from unskimmed carabao milk and salt curdled with vinegar, citrus juices, or sometimes rennet. It can also be made with goat or cow milk. It has a mild salty and tart flavor. When an acidifying agent is used, it resembles queso blanco or paneer. When rennet is used, it resembles buffalo mozzarella. Moisture content can also vary, ranging from almost gelatinous to pressed and firm. It can be eaten as is, paired with bread (usually pandesal), or used in various dishes in Filipino cuisine. It is usually sold wrapped in banana leaves.

The name, also spelled quesong putî, is Tagalog for "white cheese" and is its name in the provinces of Laguna and Bulacan. In Cavite it is known as kesilyo (also kasilyo or quesillo); in northern Cebu, it is known as queseo or kiseyo.

== Etymology ==
Kesong putî is from Spanish queso ("cheese") with the Tagalog enclitic suffix -ng, and Tagalog putî ("white"). In other parts of the Philippines, Caviteño kesilyo or kasilyo and Cebuano queseo or kiseyo, are all nativized spellings of Spanish quesillo ("little cheese").

== Production ==
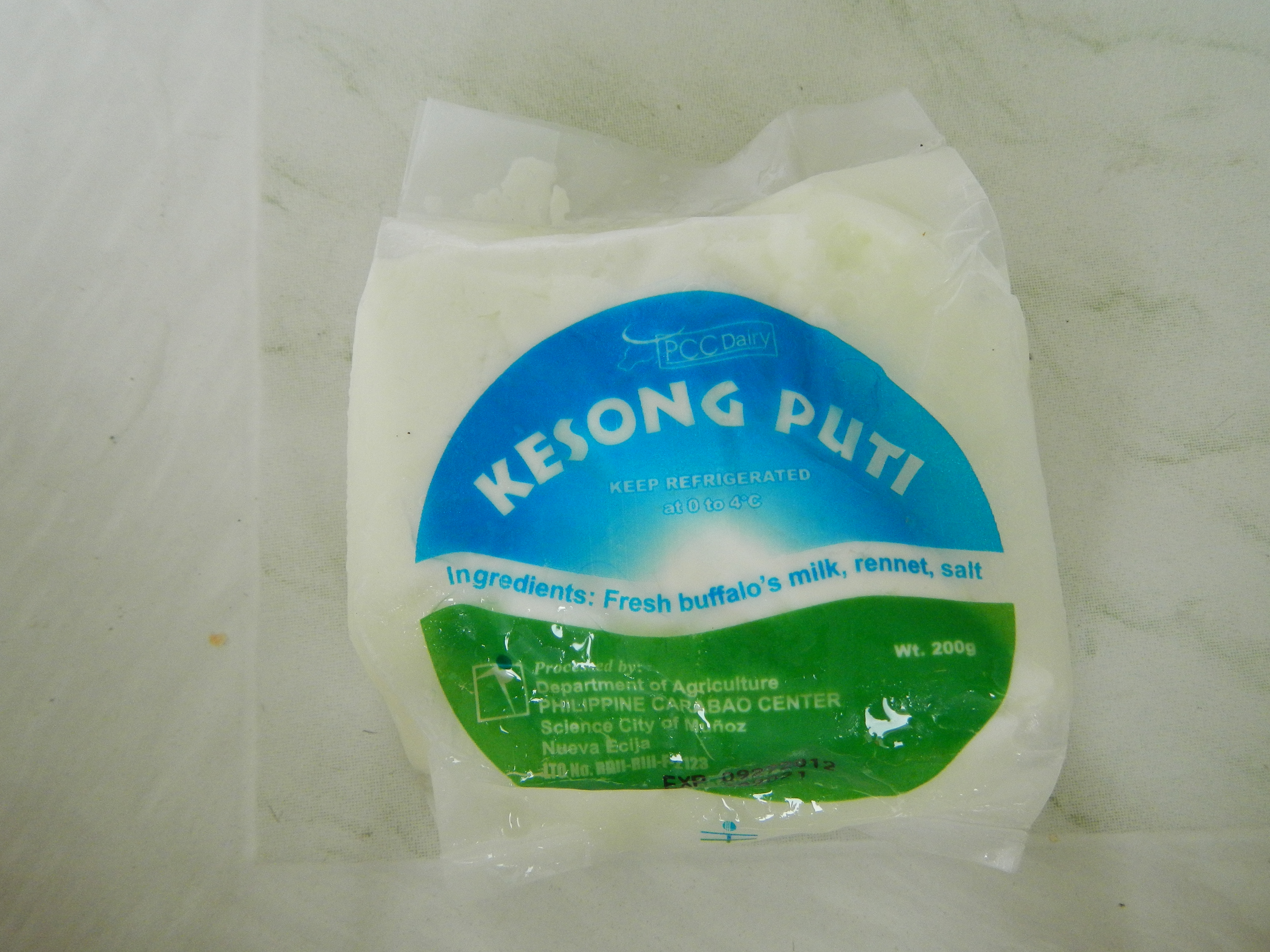
Kesong putî from the Philippine Carabao Center

Most kesong putî is made by direct acidification, similar to numerous other cheeses like queso blanco, paneer, ricotta, mascarpone. It is usually made with carabao milk, but it can also use goat or cow milk, though the latter has lower yields.

The most common way of making homemade kesong putî is by heating (but not boiling) freshly strained carabao milk with one to four teaspoons of salt for about ten to fifteen minutes while stirring constantly. The ideal temperature is around 72 to 75 °C (162 to 167 °F), as long as it does not reach 95 °C (203 °F) and above. Higher temperatures will denature the proteins, resulting in slower or even no curdling. This also pasteurizes the milk, destroying pathogens and allowing the cheese to last longer. Around a quarter cup of vinegar or citrus juices (or both) are then added to induce coagulation. It is left to curdle for around 30 minutes to an hour. The curds are strained with a cheesecloth (katsâ) leaving the soft gelatinous-like type of kesong putî. It can be further pressed and moulded to squeeze out more whey if desired. In commercial versions, the salt is usually added after the curdling either through manual mixing or by soaking the cheese in weak brine solutions.

An alternate way of making kesong puti is with rennet dissolved in a small amount of water. The rennet can either be vegetable-based or from ruminant stomachs. The steps are similar to the vinegar or citrus method but requires that the milk be cooled after it is taken off the heat, ideally to 40 to 45 °C (104 to 113 °F). This is because rennet is deactivated at higher temperatures, while lower temperatures result in slow or no coagulation. Like in the previous method, it is left to coagulate for 30 minutes to an hour. The curds are strained then cut into small cubes and left to stand for another 15 minutes to allow more moisture to seep out. This method results in more curds and a firmer type of cheese once pressed. It is the method used by the Philippine Carabao Center.

Kesong puti made with rennet is similar to mozzarella di bufala. It lacks the sour smell present in types made with vinegar or citrus juice.

== Culinary uses ==
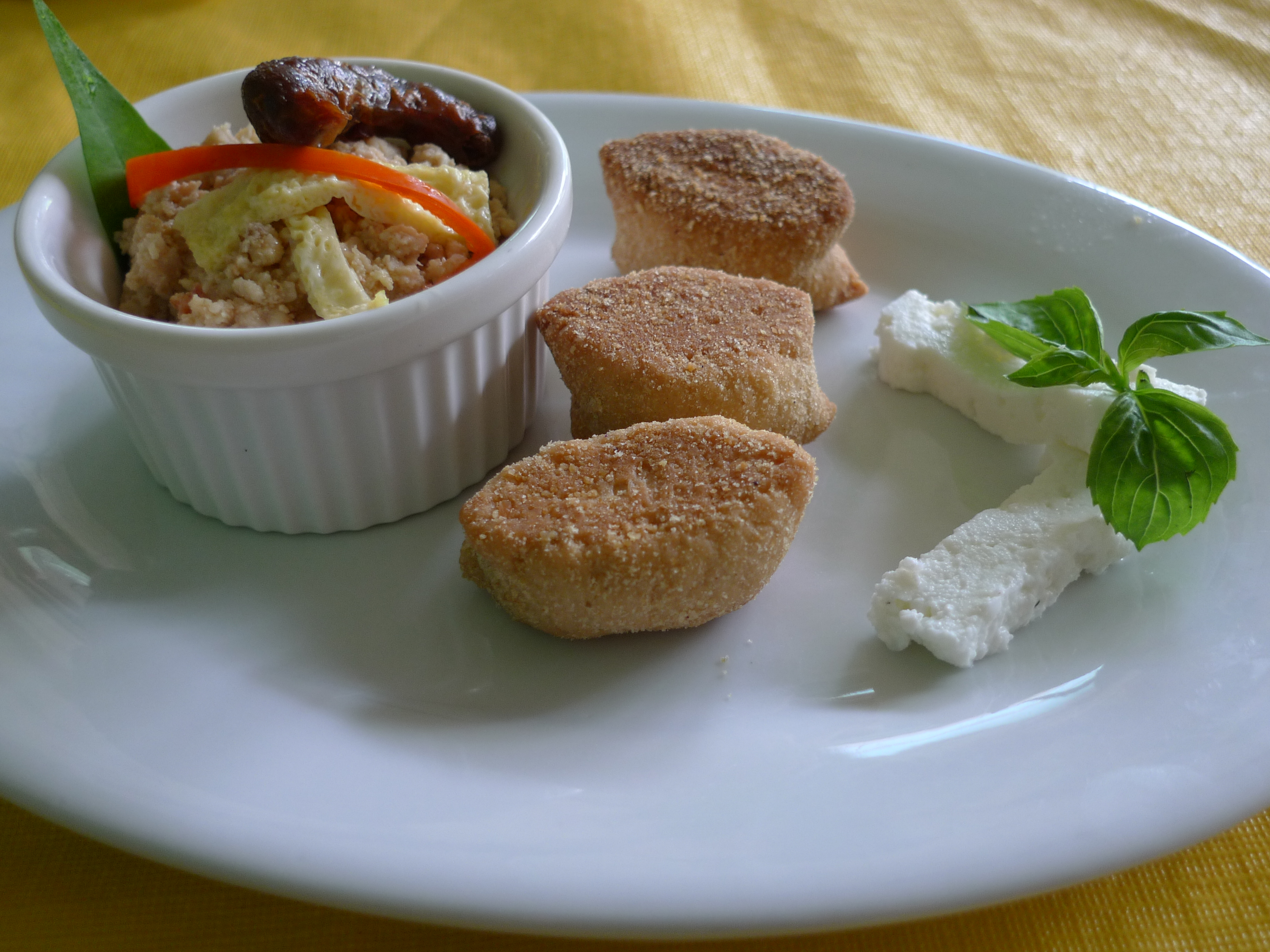
Traditional Filipino breakfast with kesong putî, pandesal, sinangág (garlic rice), and longganisa (a sausage)

Kesong putî is usually sold wrapped in banana leaves. It has a mildly salty and tart flavor and ideally has little or no odor. It can be eaten as is, either fresh or grilled on a pan. It is also commonly eaten with bread or kakanín (rice cakes), including pandesal, puto, and bibingka, It can also be used in various dishes in Filipino cuisine; including dishes like paella negra and ginataáng pakô.

Kesong putî has a shelf life of only around a week. It depends on the amount of salt used as well as the consistency of the cheese. Softer cheese spoil faster than firmer versions. It can be extended to about two weeks to a month if packaged correctly and refrigerated. However, it should never be frozen as it will form ice crystals that damage the smooth texture.

== Variants ==
There are four main regions producing variants of kesong putî that probably originated independently: Laguna, Cebu, Cavite, and Bulacan. The following are the most prevalent production techniques for commercial kesong putî among the regions:

=== Laguna ===
Laguna kesong putî or quesong putî is originally from Santa Cruz, Laguna. Its production is centered in the towns of Santa Cruz, Pagsanjan, and Lumban, with the milk used coming from neighboring towns (mostly from Lumban and Jalajala). Laguna kesong putî traditionally use rennet from carabao or cow abomasum. It undergoes lactic acid fermentation during the process. The salt is added afterwards and mixed by hand until the texture becomes smooth. It is similar to the Cebu version and is firmer than the Cavite and Bulacan version. Santa Cruz celebrates an annual Kesong Puti Festival.

=== Cebu ===
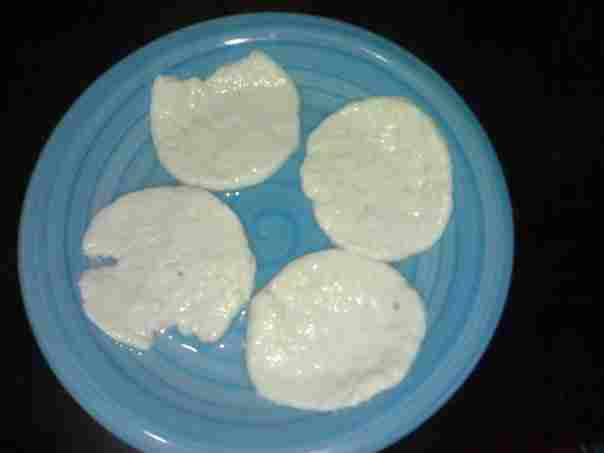
Cebu kiseyo cheese

Cebuano queseo or kiseyo production is centered on the town of Compostela and the city of Danao. It is very similar to the Laguna version and is made using the same processes. It differs only in that queseo typically use more salt and the molds are lined with muslin cloth. The muslin cloth may be pressed with a weight. It is a fermented cheese and is also usually firm, like the Laguna version. The town of Compostela celebrates an annual Queseo Festival.

=== Cavite ===
Caviteño quesillo, kesilyo, or kasilyo production is centered in the cities of General Trias and Cavite, and the municipality of Tanza. It uses vinegar as a coagulant and is not fermented, unlike the Laguna and Cebu versions. Salt is added to the milk beforehand, then a small amount of vinegar is then heated to around 60 °C (140 °F) in a small, clay pot (palayók), and the milk added and stirred until curds form. The curds are strained and molded in small cups and then further soaked in a weak brine solution. The resulting cheese has a softer consistency in comparison to the Laguna and Cebu versions.

=== Bulacan ===
Bulacan kesong putî production is centered in the towns of Santa Maria, Meycauayan, and San Miguel. It is similar to the Caviteño version as it is not a fermented cheese and primarily use vinegar. It differs in that more vinegar is used and it is not heated while curdling, then resulting curds are molded and soaked in a weak brine solution.

== See also ==
- Tibok-tibok
- Pastillas
- Paneer – Type of fresh cheese in South Asian cuisine
- List of cheeses
- List of water buffalo cheeses
