= Central Hospital =

Central Hospital may refer to:

- Ayrshire Central Hospital, also known as Irvine Central Hospital, an NHS hospital in Irvine, North Ayrshire, Scotland
- Central Hospital, Hatton, was a psychiatric hospital (closed 1995) located in Hatton, Warwickshire
- Central Mental Hospital, mental health facility housing forensic patients in Dublin, Ireland
- Central Middlesex Hospital, a teaching hospital of Imperial College London
- Helsinki University Central Hospital, the largest university hospital in Finland
- Hong Kong Central Hospital, closed in 2012
- Hospital Central (or Central Hospital), a Spanish television series
- Tampere University Hospital, the central hospital of Pirkanmaa region and one of the main hospitals in Finland
- York Central Hospital, a major hospital in Richmond Hill, Ontario

== See also ==
- Central State Hospital (disambiguation)
