= Central ward =

Central ward could refer to:

- Bournemouth Central (ward)
- Central (Cardiff electoral ward)
- Central (Hamilton ward)
- Central (Havering ward)
- Central (Hyndburn ward)
- Central (Liverpool ward)
- Central (Newham ward)
- Central Ward (City of Brisbane)
- Central Ward (Ottawa)
- Central (Swindon ward)
