= Central State Hospital for the Criminally Insane =

Central State Hospital for the Criminally Insane may refer to:

- Dodge Correctional Institution, formerly Central State Hospital for the Insane, in Waupun, Wisconsin, United States
- Middle Tennessee Mental Health Institute, formerly Central State Hospital for the Insane, in Nashville, Tennessee, United States

== See also ==
- Central State Hospital (disambiguation)
