= Central State Hospital =

Central State Hospital may refer to:

- Central State Hospital (Georgia), in Milledgeville, Georgia, United States
- Central State Hospital (Indiana), in Indiana, United States
- Central State Hospital (Kentucky), in Louisville-Jefferson County, Kentucky, United States
- Central State Hospital (Virginia), in Petersburg, Virginia, United States

== See also ==
- Central State Hospital for the Criminally Insane (disambiguation)
