= Central constituency =

Central constituency may refer to several Russian legislative constituencies:

- Central constituency (Dagestan), no. 11
- Central constituency (Kaliningrad Oblast), no. 98
- Central constituency (Krasnoyarsk Krai), no. 55
- Central constituency (Moscow), no. 208
- Central constituency (Novosibirsk Oblast), no. 136
- Central constituency (Omsk Oblast), no. 130, 1993–2007
- Central constituency (Saint Petersburg), no. 216
- Central constituency (Tatarstan), no. 31
