= Central, Bahia =

Municipality of Bahia State, Brazil

Coordinates: 11°08′09″S 42°06′46″W

Central
- Municipality
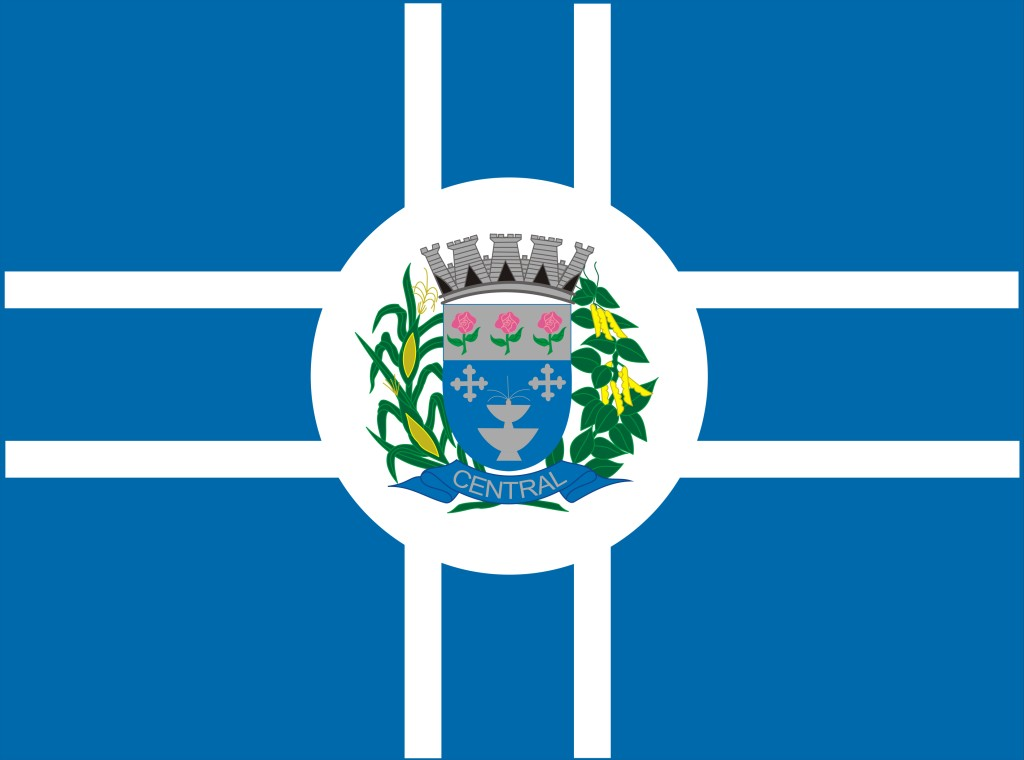
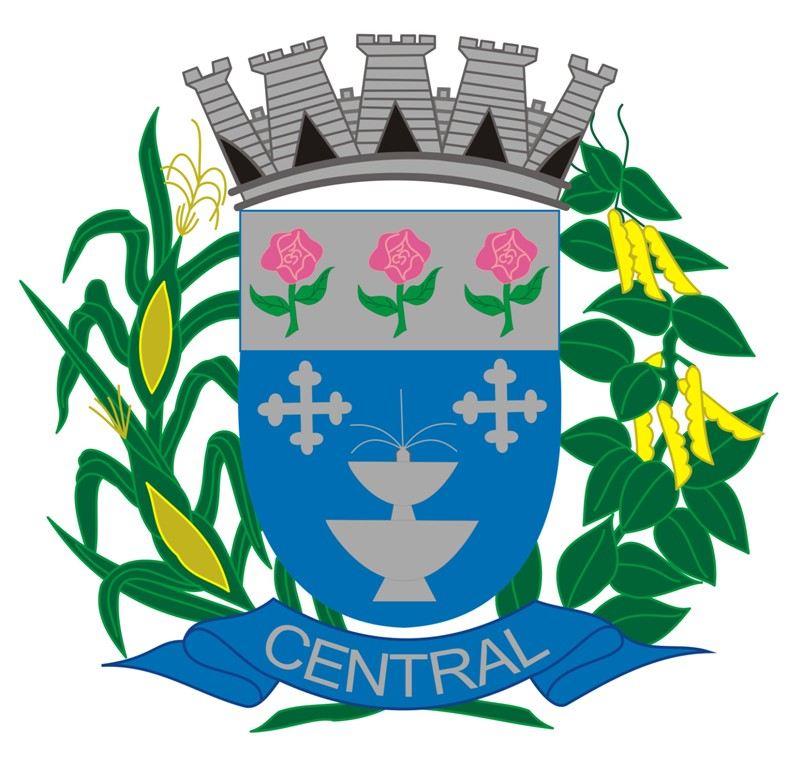
- Flag Coat of arms
- Interactive map of Central
- Country: Brazil
- Region: Nordeste
- State: Bahia

Population (2020)
  - Total: 17,280
- Time zone: UTC−3 (BRT)

Central is a municipality in the state of Bahia in the North-East region of Brazil.

== See also ==
- List of municipalities in Bahia
