= Canyon View High School =

Canyon View High School may refer to:

- Canyon View High School (Arizona) in Waddell, Arizona
- Canyon View High School (Ontario, California)
- Canyon View High School (Cedar City, Utah)
