= Central, West Virginia =

Unincorporated community in West Virginia, United States

Central
- Unincorporated community
- Location within the state of West Virginia Central (the United States)
- Coordinates: 39°20′44″N 81°31′22″W
- Country: United States
- State: West Virginia
- County: Wood
- Elevation: 636 ft (194 m)
- Time zone: UTC-5 (Eastern (EST))
  - Summer (DST): UTC-4 (EDT)
- GNIS ID: 1554099

Central is an unincorporated community in Wood County, West Virginia, United States.
