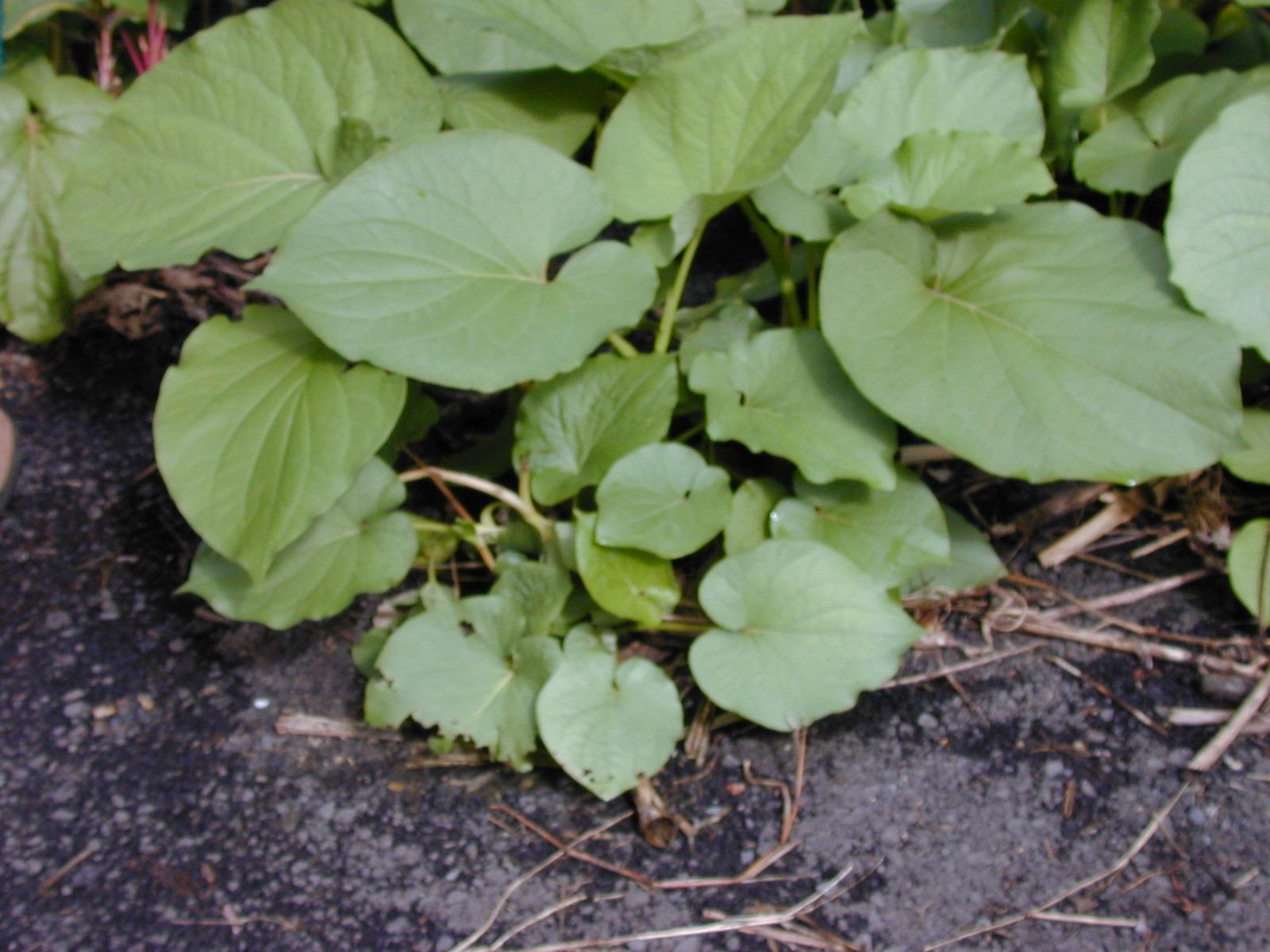

Scientific classification
- Kingdom: Plantae
- Clade: Tracheophytes
- Clade: Angiosperms
- Clade: Magnoliids
- Order: Piperales
- Family: Piperaceae
- Genus: Piper
- Species: P. auritum

Binomial name
- Piper auritum Kunth

Synonyms
- Piper sanctum

= Piper auritum =

Species of plant

Piper auritum is an aromatic culinary herb in the pepper family Piperaceae, which grows in and is endemic to tropical Central America. Common names include hoja santa (Spanish for 'sacred leaf'), yerba santa, hierba santa, Mexican pepperleaf, acuyo, tlanepa, anisillo, root beer plant, Vera Cruz pepper, sacred pepper, and juniapa.

== Description ==
It is a perennial herbaceous plant up to 6 m (20 ft) in height with heart-shaped velvety leaves. The leaves can reach up to 30 cm (12 in) or more in size. The flowers are in simple white spikes containing myriads of tiny florets which rise above the foliage like candles.

The entire plant is said to have the fragrance of Sassafras. The complex flavor is not so easily described; it has been compared to eucalyptus, licorice, sassafras, anise, nutmeg, mint, tarragon, and black pepper. The flavor is stronger in the young stems and veins.

=== Chemistry ===
The leaf oil of Piper auritum contains a relatively high concentration of hepatotoxic safrole, around 70%. A few of the other 40 constituents occurring in minor quantities were α-thujene, α-pinene, camphene, β-pinene, myrcene, and limonene.

== Synonyms ==
- Artanthe sancta Miq.
- Piper diandrum C.DC.
- Piper dissimulans Trel.
- Piper heterophlebium Trel.
- Piper papantlense C.DC.
- Piper venulosum Trel.
- Piper sanctum

== Distribution and habitat ==
It is native to the Americas, from northern South America to Mexico, and is also cultivated in California and southeast Florida.

== Uses ==
It is often used in Mexican cuisine in tamales, fish or meat wrapped in its fragrant leaves for cooking, and as an essential ingredient in mole verde, a green sauce originally from the Puebla/Oaxaca region of Mexico. It is also used to flavor eggs and soups like pozole. In Central Mexico, it is used to flavor chocolate drinks. In southeastern Mexico, a green liquor called verdín is made from hoja santa.

While typically used fresh, it is also used dried, although the drying process removes much of the flavor and makes the leaf too brittle to be used as a wrapper.
