= Central (Hyndburn ward) =

- Shown within Hyndburn
- Area: 0.90 km^{2} (0.35 sq mi)
- Population: 5,807 (2011)
  - Density: 6,452/km^{2} (16,710/sq mi)
- District: Hyndburn
- Ceremonial county: Lancashire
- Region: North West
- Country: England
- Sovereign state: United Kingdom
- UK Parliament: Hyndburn
- Councillors: Mohammad Ayub (Labour); Abdul Khan (Labour)

Central is one of the 18 electoral wards that form the Parliamentary constituency of Hyndburn, Lancashire, England. The ward returns two councillors to represent the area west of Accrington town centre on the Hyndburn Borough Council. As of the May 2019 Council election, Central had an electorate of 3,822.
