= Quesillo =

Types of cheese and other foods

Quesillo (Spanish pronunciation: [keˈsiʎo], meaning "little cheese") refers to different Latin American, Spanish, and Filipino foods or dishes depending on the country:

== Argentina ==
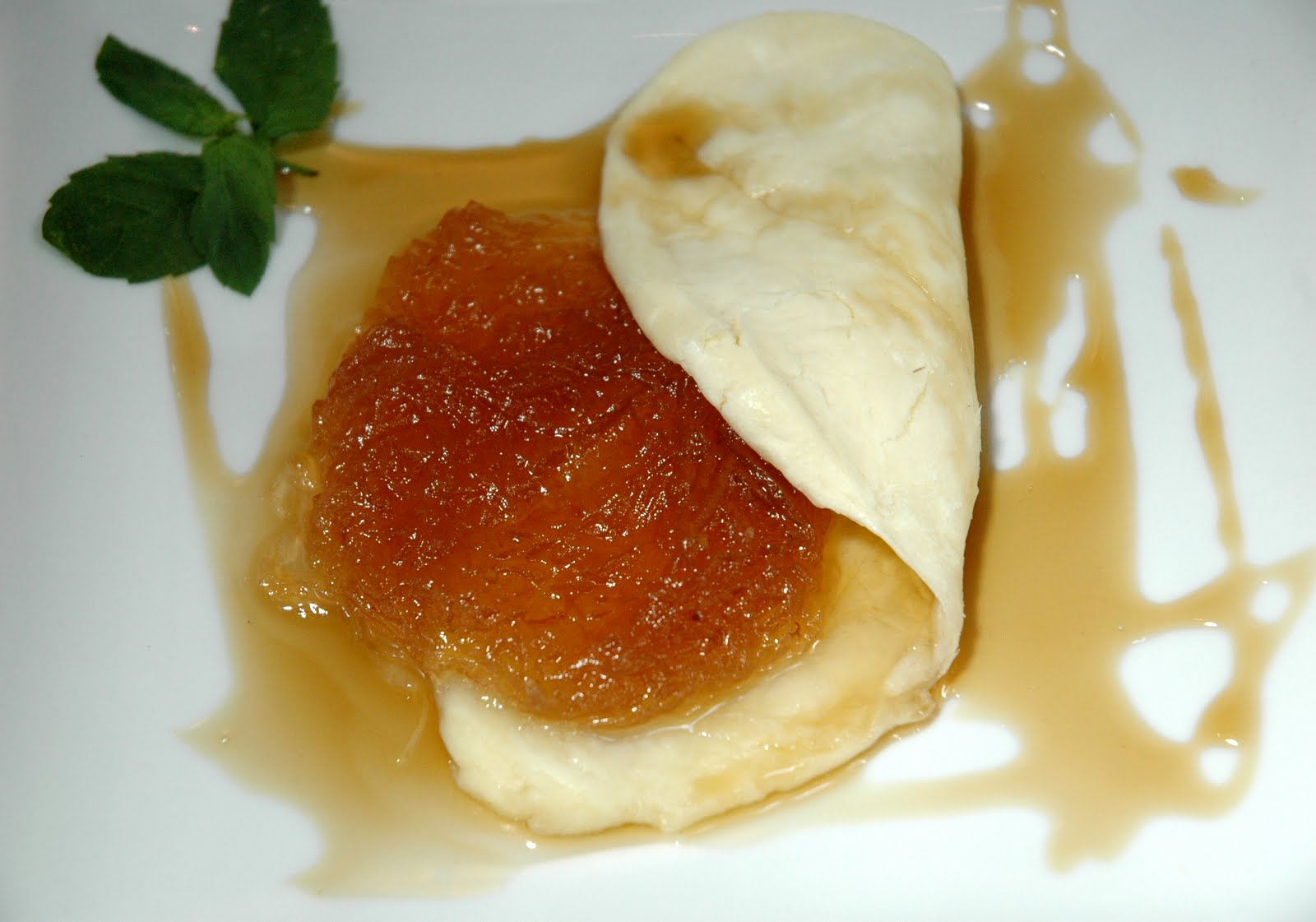
Quesillo filled with dulce de cayote from Salta, Argentina

Argentine quesillo is a notable product of the Calchaquíes and Lerma valleys. It dates back to the Spanish conquest when European and traditional Creole recipes were combined. It is made by hand with cow's milk or goat through a process known as "filado" or spinning, which grants the product its distinctive characteristics.

== Bolivia ==
In Bolivia, quesillo refers to a type of small fresh cheese. It is a popular farm cheese of the Cochabamba valley, usually made from raw cow milk, pepsin and acid coagulation, a maize size curd, and a dry-salted, hand-formed, palm-size mold. After resting for two or three hours it has a crumbly consistency and is ready to eat.

== Canary Islands (Spain) ==
In the Canary Islands of Spain, quesillo refers to a dessert that is a type of flan made with whole eggs and sweetened condensed milk, which makes for a firmer texture than traditional flan. The Canary or Spanish quesillo is somewhat similar to the Venezuelan quesillo (read below) in that both are desserts.

== Colombia ==
In Colombia, quesillo refers to a type of double cream cheese wrapped within a plantain leaf, made originally in the Tolima Department; the town of Guamo is most known for this dairy product. It is made commercially in dairy regions such as Bogotá, Ubaté and other regions of Cundinamarca and Antioquia. Famous brands of Colombian quesillo include Pasco and Colanta.

== Dominican Republic ==
In the Dominican Republic, quesillo refers to dessert. Recipes vary slightly, but the dish is basically flan made out of eggs and sweetened milk.

== Mexico ==
In Mexico, quesillo refers to a very popular type of string cheese sold in balls of various sizes. It is also known as "queso Oaxaca" or Oaxacan cheese.

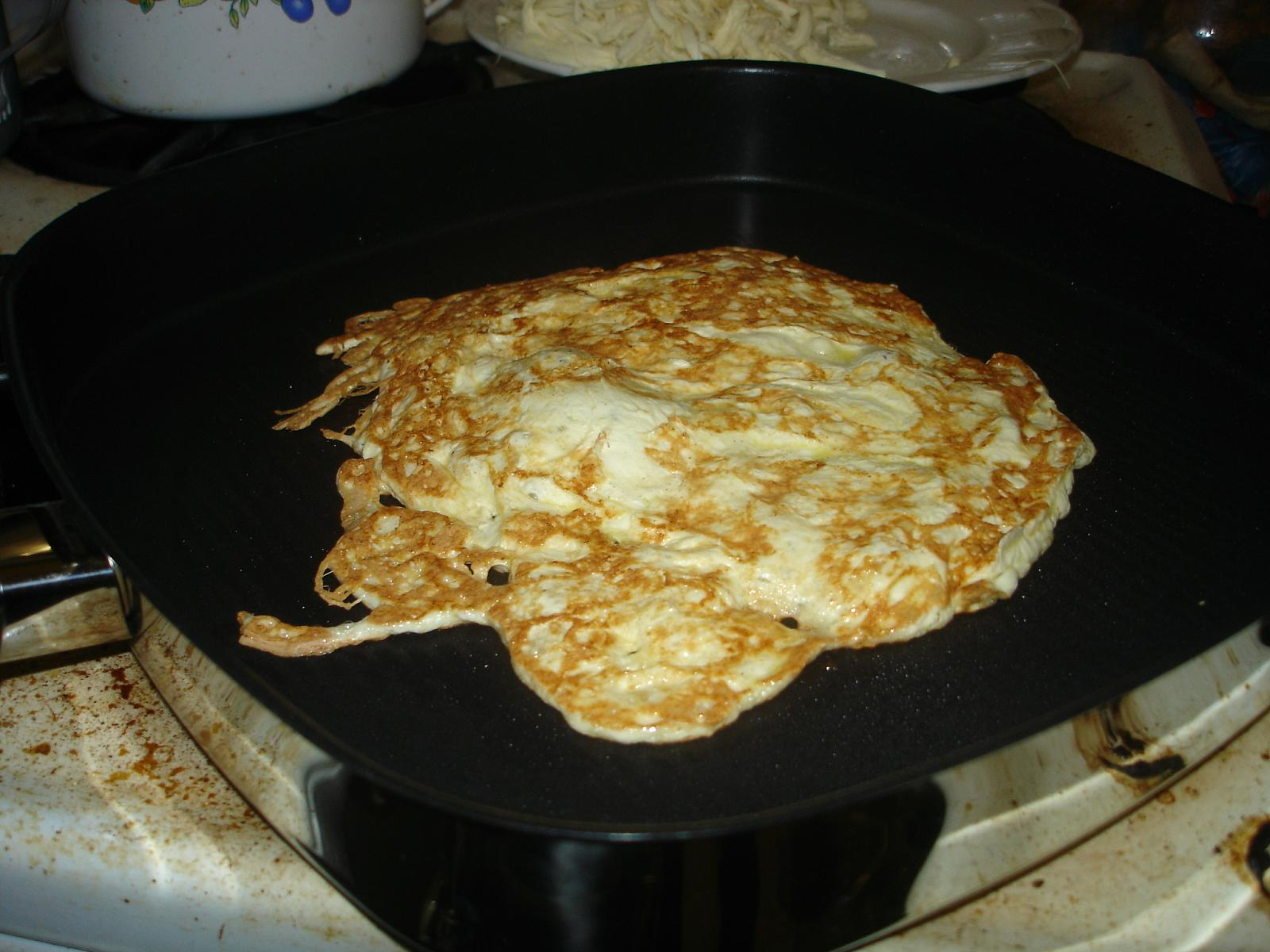
Grilled Oaxacan quesillo

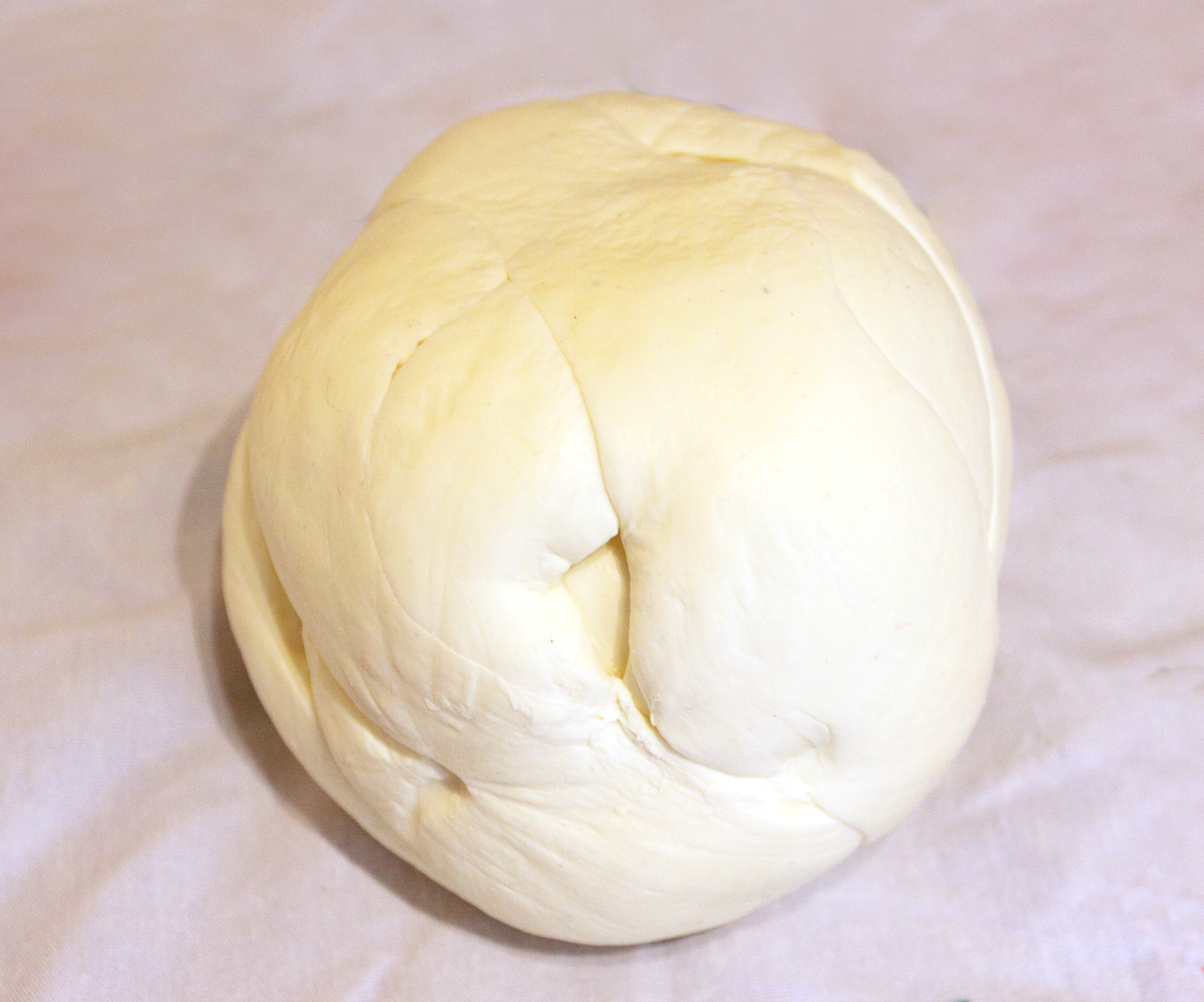
A ball of Oaxacan quesillo

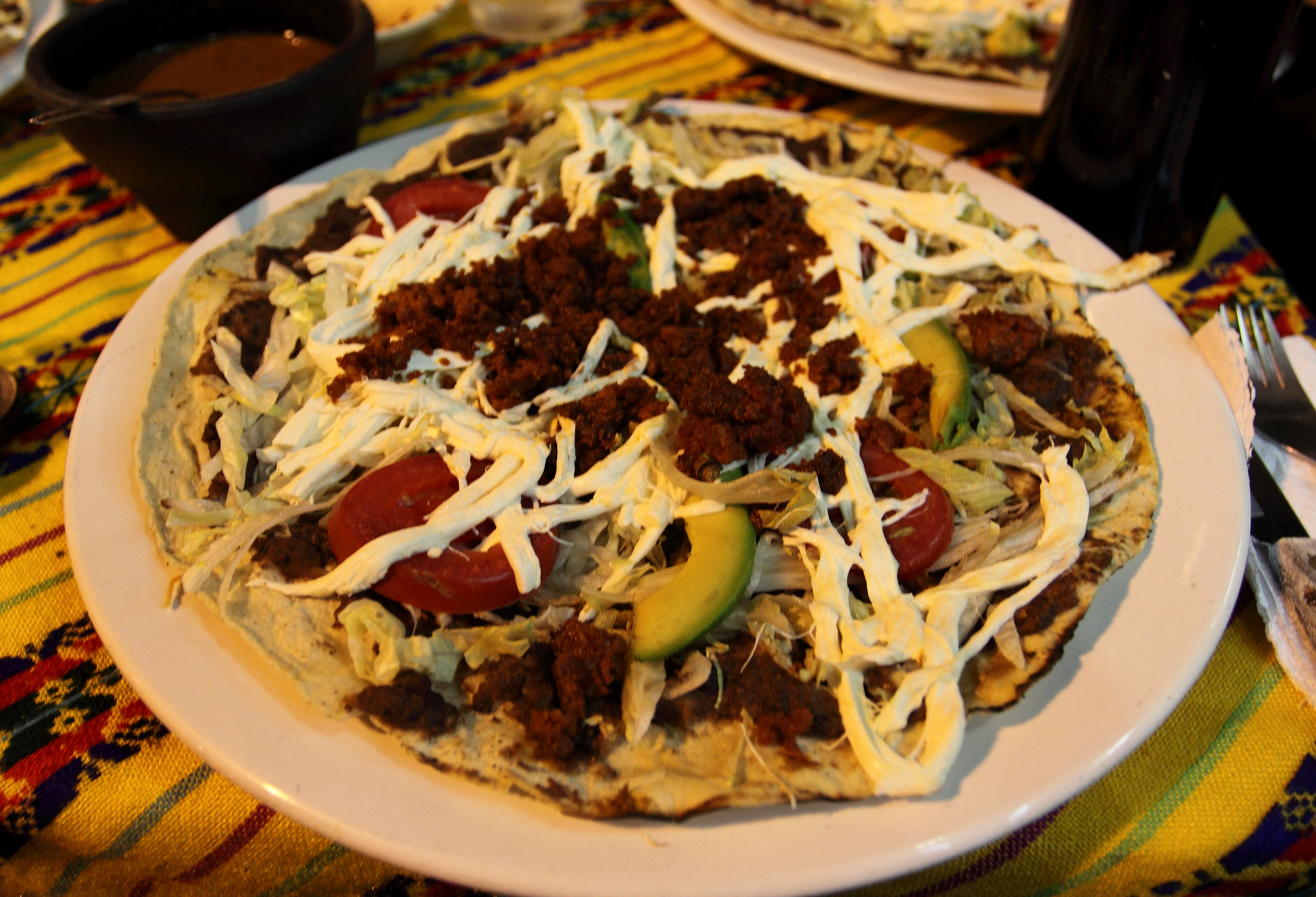
A tlayuda topped with quesillo

== Nicaragua ==
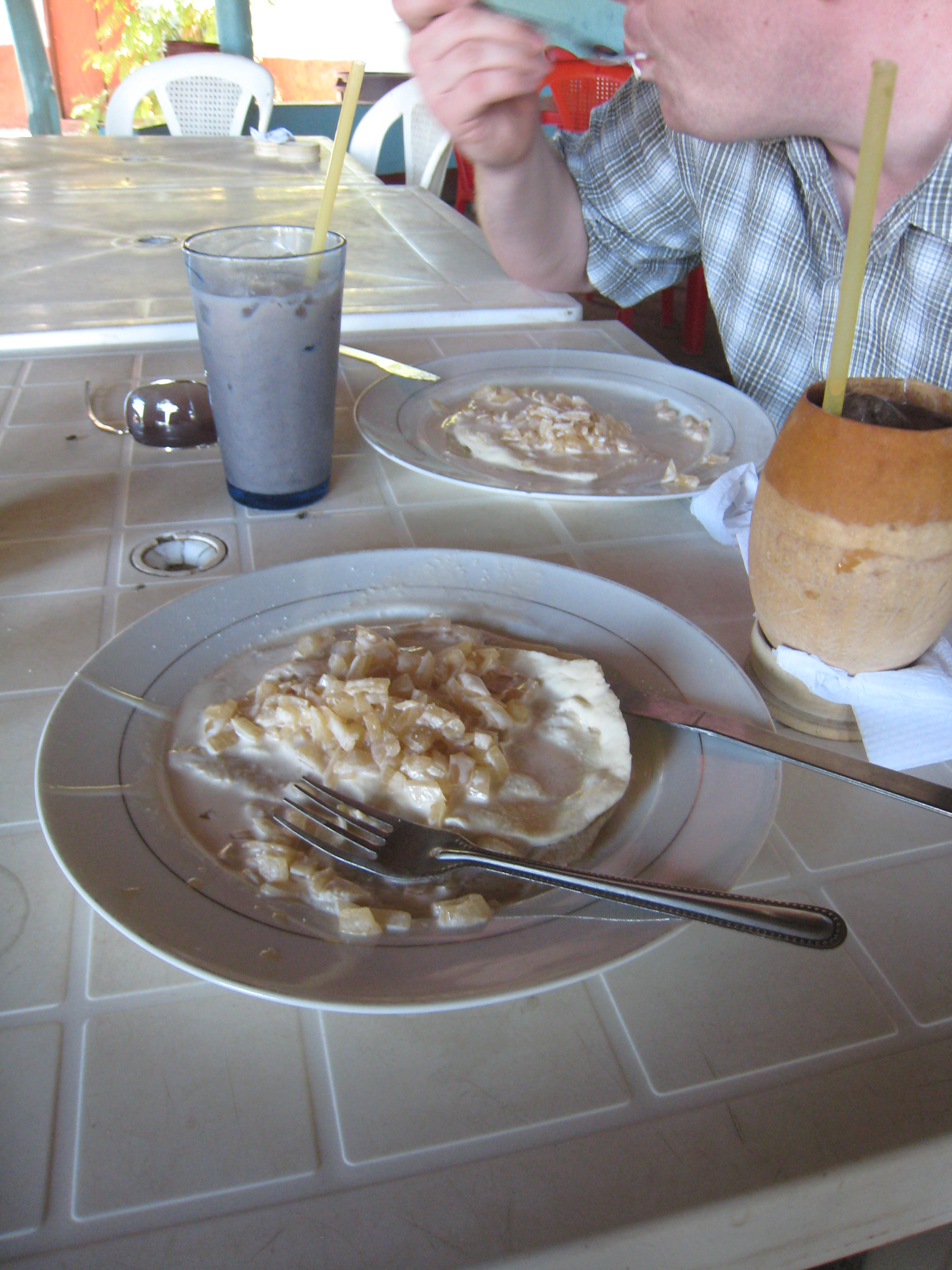
Nicaraguan quesillo

In Nicaragua, quesillo refers to a dish typically made from a thick corn tortilla wrapped around soft cheese (with the same name and of consistency similar to mozzarella cheese), pickled onions, and a sauce of sour cream or liquid cheese and vinegar. Originally from the León Department, there is a great dispute as to where they were invented, if in either of the municipalities of Nagarote or La Paz Centro. The main difference between the two is that La Paz Centro's quesillos use purple onions. They are often sold on roadsides as a quick snack or in the street by quesilleras, women who sell quesillos. The most famous quesillo stands are located on the highway between the cities of León and Managua.

A popular pun of this locale is to alter the phrase claro que si, meaning "of course", into claro quesillos. Because of their runny contents, quesillos are usually confined by a thin plastic sheath. Often the plastic bag is tied off, a small corner is bitten off, and the quesillo is squeezed out of a small hole in the corner.

== Peru ==
In Peru, quesillo refers to small patties of fresh cheese. The cheese is typically made by small home producers and sold by women on streets and in markets and small shops. This form of cheese is particularly common in Andean regions where it is used in stews and soups.

== Philippines ==
In the Philippines, quesillo refers to various soft, white, unaged cheeses made from carabao or goat milk curdled with vinegar, citrus juices, and sometimes rennet. It is nativized into various spellings depending on the region. In the island of Luzon, it is known as kesong puti in Tagalog or kesilyo (or kasilyo) in Caviteño. In Cebu, a similar cheese is known as queseo or kiseyo.

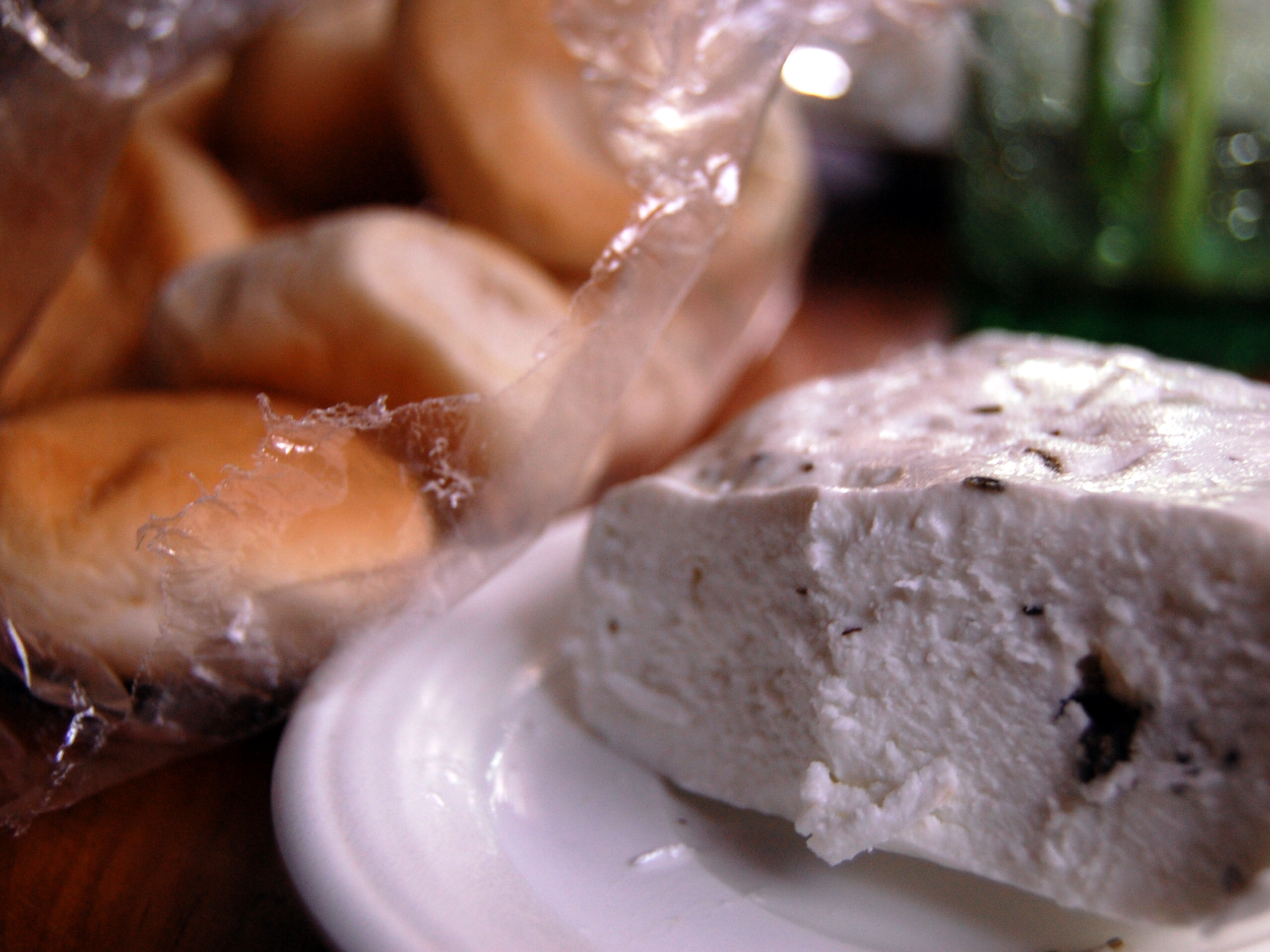
Tagalog kesong puti or kesilyo

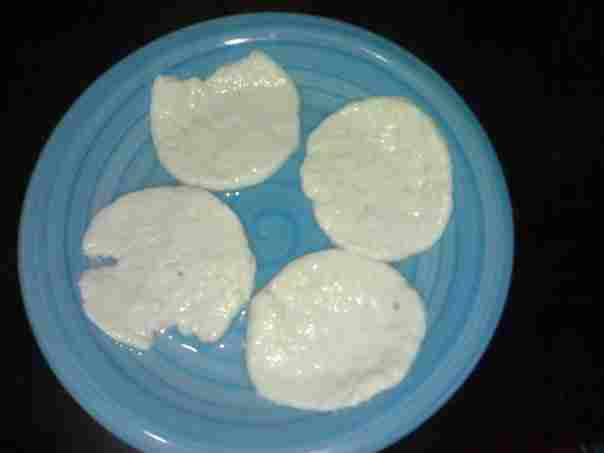
Cebuano queseo

== Venezuela ==
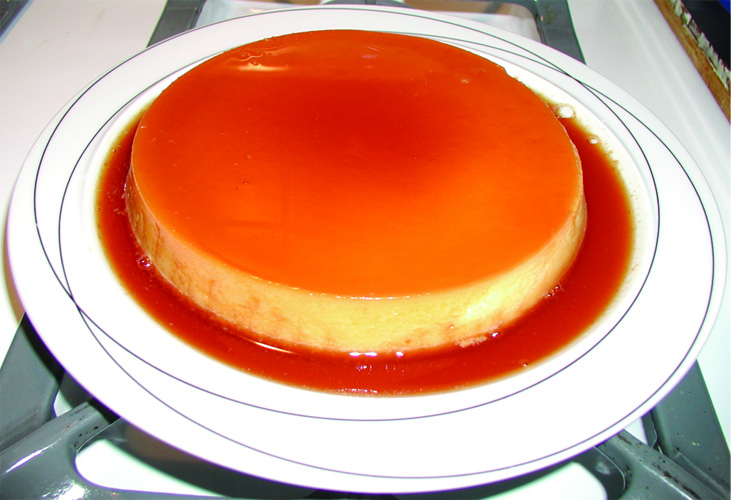
Venezuelan quesillo

In Venezuela, the term quesillo refers to a type of dessert made with eggs, condensed milk, and caramelized sugar. The Venezuelan quesillo is similar to the French-Spanish known as crème caramel or flan. The original recipe dating back to the 18th century does not use condensed milk but milk and sugar at a ratio of four cups of milk to one pound of sugar

This dessert plate is also popular on the Dutch Caribbean islands of Aruba, Bonaire and Curaçao which are just off the north coast of Venezuela. In the Philippines, the dish is known as leche flan.

It is sweet and jelly-like, with a distinctive taste (not entirely like crème caramel).

== See also ==
- Panela
