= Central Coast =

Central Coast may refer to:

== Australia ==
- Central Coast (New South Wales), an official region of New South Wales, Australia
  - Central Coast Council (New South Wales), a local government area in New South Wales
  - Central Coast Mariners, the professional football A-league club based in the region
  - Central Coast United FC, an amateur football club based in the region
  - Central Coast Stadium, Gosford
  - Central Coast Storm, a rugby league club based in the region
  - Central Coast Waves, a rugby union team playing in the Shute Shield
- Central Coast Council (Tasmania), a local government area in Tasmania

== Canada ==
- Central Coast Regional District, in British Columbia, Canada

== Solomon Islands ==
- Central Coast F.C., the semi-professional football club based in the region of Solomon Islands

== United States ==
- Central Coast (California), in California, United States
- Central Coast AVA, a large American viticultural area
