= Canyon View High School (Ontario, California) =

Public school in California, United States

Coordinates: 34.081086°N 117.657975°W

- 557 West Fifth St., Ontario, California 91762

Information
- Type: Public secondary
- Established: 1998
- Principal: Art Castro
- Teaching staff: 11.00 (FTE)
- Enrollment: 104 (2022-2023)
- Student to teacher ratio: 9.5
- Mascot: Coyotes
- Website: Canyon View High School

Canyon View High School is a public secondary school in Ontario, California. It is one of the eleven schools of the Chaffey Joint Union High School District. Canyon View is one of two continuation schools in the district and enrolls more than 200 students in grades 10 through 12.

== History ==
Canyon View High School was established in 1998 and is physically located on the northwest corner of the Chaffey High School campus. Starting the 2010–2011 school year, due to budget cuts, Canyon View High School has merged with Valley View High School in Ontario.
