= Central Valley =

Central Valley may refer to:

== Valleys ==
- Chilean Central Valley, Chile
- Central Valley (Chilean wine region), Chile
- Costa Rican Central Valley, Costa Rica
- Central Valley (Scotland), or Central Lowlands
- Central Valley (California), United States
- Central Valley of Cochabamba, Bolivia
- Central Valley of Tarija, Bolivia

== Settlements ==
- Central Valley, New York, United States
- Central Valley, Utah, United States

== See also ==
- Central Valley Greenway
- Central Valley High School (disambiguation)
