= Central, Indiana =

Unincorporated community in Indiana, United States

- Unincorporated community
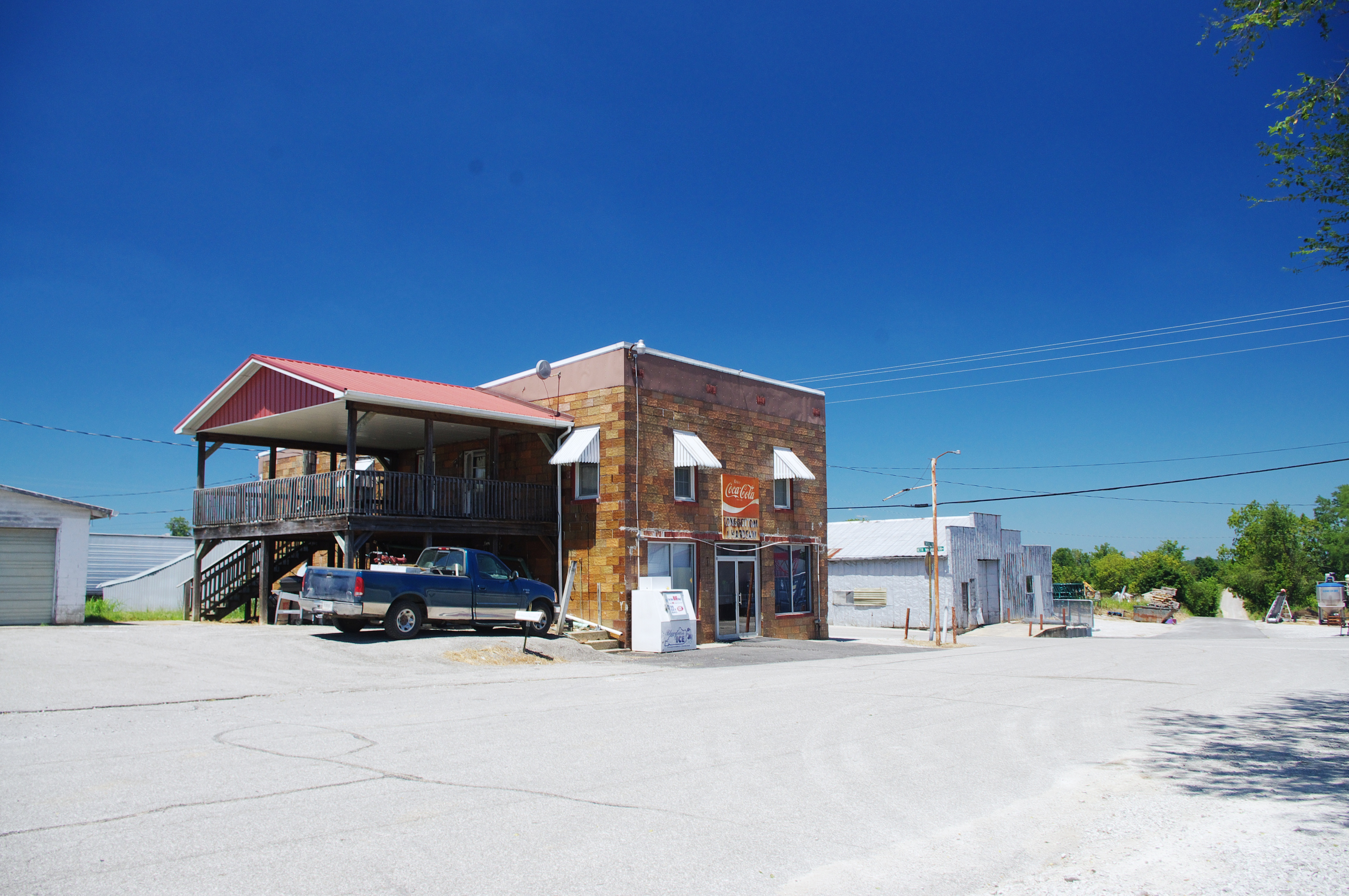
- Longbottom & Hardsaw in Central

- Harrison County's location in Indiana

- Location in Harrison County
- Coordinates: 38°05′59″N 86°09′31″W
- Country: United States
- State: Indiana
- County: Harrison
- Township: Heth
- Elevation: 699 ft (213 m)
- ZIP Code: 47112
- FIPS code: 18-11854
- GNIS feature ID: 432348

Central is an unincorporated community in Heth Township, Harrison County, Indiana.

== History ==
The town of Central was plotted by William Smith in 1890. It originally contained fifteen lots, two parallel streets covering 5 acres (20,000 m^{2}) of land.

The church in the center of town was deeded its land from Charles Kopp in 1882. The original church then deeded in turn to the Missionary Society of the Churches of Christ in 1907.

Longbottom-Hardsaw, a business operating in Central, was built in 1947 on the corner of Central Drive SW and Heth Washington Road SW.

A Dollar General store is located at the northwest corner of State Road 135 and Heth Washington Road SW.

The Central Post office was operated from 1879 until 1999 when the area was taken over by the Mauckport and Corydon Post Offices.

Central had its own school from 1900 to 1945 when it was absorbed into the South Harrison Consolidated School District.

== Geography and Location ==
Central is located around the intersection of Heth Washington Road SW and Central Drive SW south of Corydon, north of Mauckport, and east of New Amsterdam.
