= Central Valley High School =

Central Valley High School is the name of several high schools:

== Central Valley, California ==
- Central Valley Christian High School Visalia, California
- Central Valley High School (Ceres, California), Ceres, California
- Central Valley High School (Shasta Lake, California), Shasta Lake, California

== Other schools ==
- Central Valley High School (North Dakota), Buxton, a high school in North Dakota
- Central Valley High School (Pennsylvania), Monaca, Pennsylvania
- Central Valley High School (Washington), Spokane Valley, Washington
