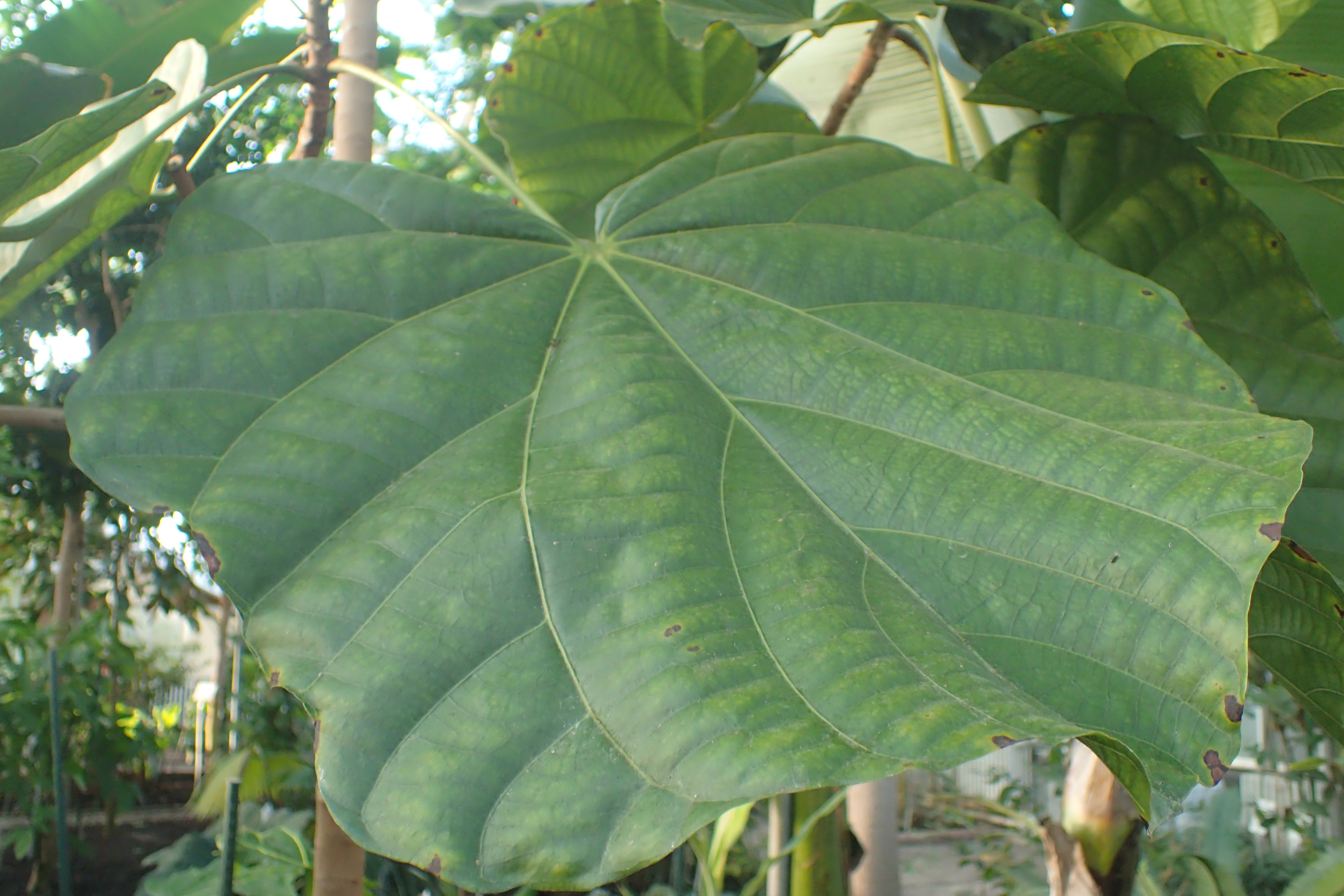
- Matisia cordata at Berlin Botanical Garden and Botanical Museum

Scientific classification
- Kingdom: Plantae
- Clade: Embryophytes
- Clade: Tracheophytes
- Clade: Spermatophytes
- Clade: Angiosperms
- Clade: Eudicots
- Clade: Rosids
- Order: Malvales
- Family: Malvaceae
- Subfamily: Bombacoideae
- Genus: Matisia; Bonpl.

= Matisia =

Genus of flowering plants

Matisia is a genus of flowering plants in the family Malvaceae sensu lato or Bombacaceae. It includes 66 species native to the tropical Americas, ranging from Nicaragua to northern Brazil and Bolivia.

== Species ==
66 species are accepted.

- Matisia alata Little
- Matisia alchornifolia Triana & Planch.
- Matisia amplifolia Pittier
- Matisia anchicayana Fern.Alonso
- Matisia aquilarum Fern.Alonso & Camp.-Pineda
- Matisia arteagensis Cuatrec.
- Matisia bicolor Ducke
- Matisia bolivarii Cuatrec.
- Matisia bracteolosa Ducke
- Matisia bullata Fern.Alonso
- Matisia calimana Cuatrec.
- Matisia carderi Fern.Alonso
- Matisia castano H.Karst. & Triana
- Matisia changuinolana Fern.Alonso & Camp.-Pineda
- Matisia coloradorum Benoist
- Matisia cordata Bonpl.
- Matisia cornu-copiae Triana & Planch.
- Matisia cruceto Cuatrec.
- Matisia cuatrecasasiana Fern.Alonso
- Matisia dolichopoda (A.Robyns) Cuatrec.
- Matisia dolichosiphon (A.Robyns & S.Nilsson) W.S.Alverson
- Matisia dowdingii Sprague
- Matisia exalata W.S.Alverson
- Matisia floccosa Fern.Alonso
- Matisia genesiana Fern.Alonso
- Matisia gentryi Fern.Alonso
- Matisia giacomettoi Romero
- Matisia glandifera Triana & Planch.
- Matisia hirsutissima Fern.Alonso
- Matisia hirta Cuatrec.
- Matisia huallagensis Cuatrec.
- Matisia idroboi Cuatrec.
- Matisia intricata (A.Robyns & S.Nilsson) W.S.Alverson
- Matisia jefensis (A.Robyns & S.Nilsson) W.S.Alverson
- Matisia lasiocalyx K.Schum.
- Matisia lecythicarpa Ducke
- Matisia leptandra (Cuatrec.) Cuatrec.
- Matisia lomensis (Cuatrec.) Cuatrec.
- Matisia longiflora Gleason
- Matisia longipes Little
- Matisia longitubulosa (A.Robyns) Cuatrec.
- Matisia lozanoi Fern.Alonso
- Matisia malacocalyx (A.Robyns & S.Nilsson) W.S.Alverson
- Matisia mutatana Fern.Alonso
- Matisia obliquifolia Standl.
- Matisia oblongifolia Poepp. & Endl.
- Matisia ochrocalyx K.Schum.
- Matisia pacifica Fern.Alonso
- Matisia palenquiana (A.Robyns) W.S.Alverson
- Matisia petaquillae Fern.Alonso & Camp.-Pineda
- Matisia putumayensis (Cuatrec.) Cuatrec.
- Matisia racemifera Fern.Alonso
- Matisia rufula Fern.Alonso
- Matisia samariensis (Cuatrec.) Cuatrec.
- Matisia sanblasensis (A.Robyns) Cuatrec.
- Matisia sclerophylla Cuatrec.
- Matisia serpicostata Fern.Alonso
- Matisia soegengii Cuatrec.
- Matisia spathacea Fern.Alonso
- Matisia stenopetala Standl. & Cuatrec.
- Matisia sulcata (Cuatrec.) Cuatrec.
- Matisia tinamastiana A.Estrada & Cascante
- Matisia uberrima Fern.Alonso
- Matisia uribei (García-Barr. & Hern.Cam.) Cuatrec.
- Matisia valdes-bermejoi Fern.Alonso & Castrov.
- Matisia victoriana Fern.Alonso

=== Formerly placed here ===
- Quararibea grandifolia (Little) Cuatrec. (as M. grandifolia Little) – molinillo
