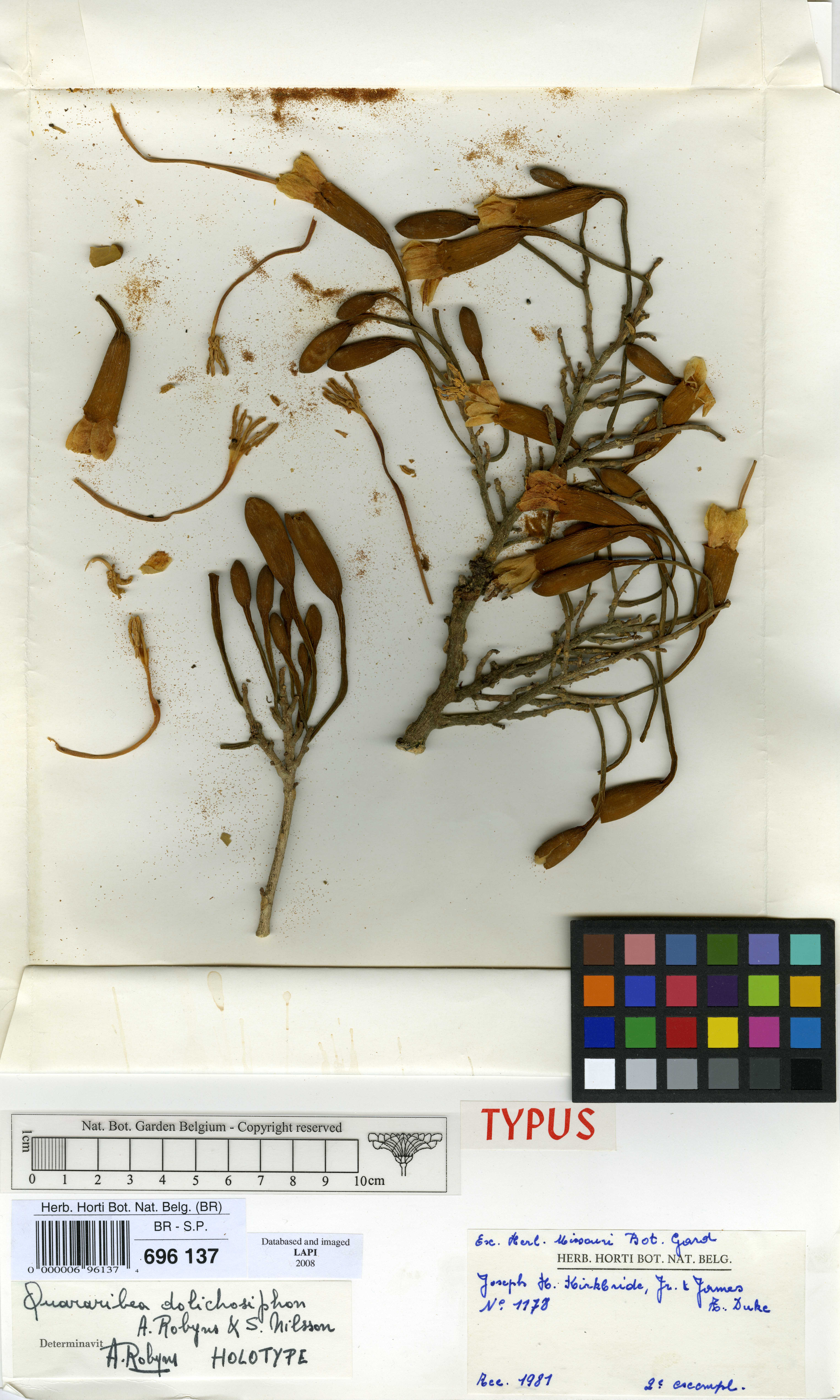

Conservation status
- Vulnerable (IUCN 2.3)

Scientific classification
- Kingdom: Plantae
- Clade: Tracheophytes
- Clade: Angiosperms
- Clade: Eudicots
- Clade: Rosids
- Order: Malvales
- Family: Malvaceae
- Genus: Matisia
- Species: M. dolichosiphon

Binomial name
- Matisia dolichosiphon (Robyns & Nilsson) W.S.Alverson

Synonyms
- Quararibea dolichosiphon A.Robyns & S.Nilsson

= Matisia dolichosiphon =

Species of flowering plant

Matisia dolichosiphon is a species of flowering plant in the Malvaceae family. It is a tree found only in Panama. It was first published as Quararibea dolichosiphon in Bull. Jard. Bot. Natl. Belg. 40: 353 (1970) by A.Robyns & S.Nilsson. In 1989 William Surprison Alverson placed the species in the genus Matisia as Matisia dolichosiphon.
