= Matisia jefensis =

Conservation status
- Vulnerable (IUCN 3.1)

Scientific classification
- Kingdom: Plantae
- Clade: Embryophytes
- Clade: Tracheophytes
- Clade: Angiosperms
- Clade: Eudicots
- Clade: Rosids
- Order: Malvales
- Family: Malvaceae
- Genus: Matisia
- Species: M. jefensis

Binomial name
- Matisia jefensis (A.Robyns & S.Nilsson) W.S.Alverson

Synonyms
- Quararibea jefensis A.Robyns & S.Nilsson

Species of flowering plant

Matisia jefensis, synonym Quararibea jefensis, is a species of flowering plant in the family Malvaceae. It is found only in Panama. It is threatened by habitat loss.
