= Matisia palenquiana =

Conservation status
- Endangered (IUCN 3.1)

Scientific classification
- Kingdom: Plantae
- Clade: Tracheophytes
- Clade: Angiosperms
- Clade: Eudicots
- Clade: Rosids
- Order: Malvales
- Family: Malvaceae
- Genus: Matisia
- Species: M. palenquiana

Binomial name
- Matisia palenquiana (A.Robyns) W.S.Alverson

Species of flowering plant

Matisia palenquiana is a species of flowering plant in the family Malvaceae sensu lato or Bombacaceae. It is found only in Ecuador. Its natural habitats are subtropical or tropical moist lowland forests and subtropical or tropical moist montane forests. It is threatened by habitat loss.
