= Matisia sanblasensis =

Conservation status
- Least Concern (IUCN 3.1)

Scientific classification
- Kingdom: Plantae
- Clade: Tracheophytes
- Clade: Angiosperms
- Clade: Eudicots
- Clade: Rosids
- Order: Malvales
- Family: Malvaceae
- Genus: Matisia
- Species: M. sanblasensis

Binomial name
- Matisia sanblasensis (A.Robyns) Cuatrec.

Synonyms
- Quararibea sanblasensis A.Robyns

Species of flowering plant

Matisia sanblasensis is a species of flowering plant in the family Malvaceae. It a tree native to Colombia and Panama. It is threatened by habitat loss.
