= Matisia alata =

Conservation status
- Near Threatened (IUCN 3.1)

Scientific classification
- Kingdom: Plantae
- Clade: Tracheophytes
- Clade: Angiosperms
- Clade: Eudicots
- Clade: Rosids
- Order: Malvales
- Family: Malvaceae
- Genus: Matisia
- Species: M. alata

Binomial name
- Matisia alata Little

Species of flowering plant

Matisia alata is a species of flowering plant in the family Malvaceae sensu lato or Bombacaceae. It is a tree native to southwestern Colombia and western Ecuador. Its natural habitat is lowland tropical rain forest. It is threatened by habitat loss.
