= Matisia dolichopoda =

Conservation status
- Least Concern (IUCN 3.1)

Scientific classification
- Kingdom: Plantae
- Clade: Tracheophytes
- Clade: Angiosperms
- Clade: Eudicots
- Clade: Rosids
- Order: Malvales
- Family: Malvaceae
- Genus: Matisia
- Species: M. dolichopoda

Binomial name
- Matisia dolichopoda (A.Robyns) Cuatrec.

Synonyms
- Quararibea dolichopoda A.Robyns

Species of flowering plant

Matisia dolichopoda is a species of flowering plant in the family Malvaceae. It is a tree native to Panama and Colombia. It is threatened by habitat loss.
