= Matisia exalata =

Conservation status
- Least Concern (IUCN 3.1)

Scientific classification
- Kingdom: Plantae
- Clade: Tracheophytes
- Clade: Angiosperms
- Clade: Eudicots
- Clade: Rosids
- Order: Malvales
- Family: Malvaceae
- Genus: Matisia
- Species: M. exalata

Binomial name
- Matisia exalata W.S.Alverson

Species of flowering plant

Matisia exalata is a species of flowering plant in the family Malvaceae sensu lato or Bombacaceae. It is a tree found only in Panama. It is threatened by habitat loss.
