= Matisia stenopetala =

Conservation status
- Vulnerable (IUCN 2.3)

Scientific classification
- Kingdom: Plantae
- Clade: Tracheophytes
- Clade: Angiosperms
- Clade: Eudicots
- Clade: Rosids
- Order: Malvales
- Family: Malvaceae
- Genus: Matisia
- Species: M. stenopetala

Binomial name
- Matisia stenopetala Standl. & Cuatrec.

Species of plant

Matisia stenopetala is a species of flowering plant in the family Malvaceae sensu lato or Bombacaceae. It is found only in Peru.
