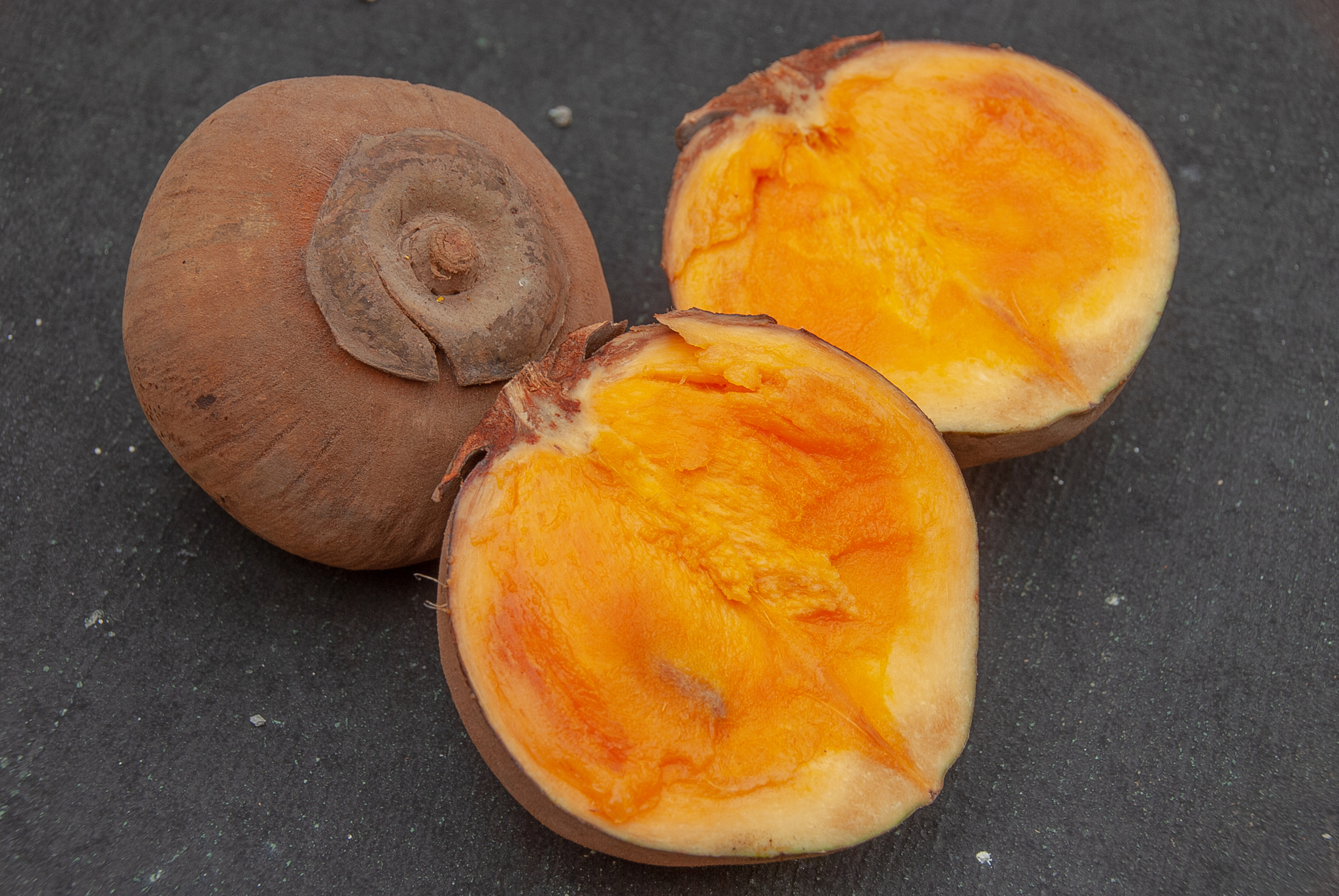
- Fruit, in Brazil
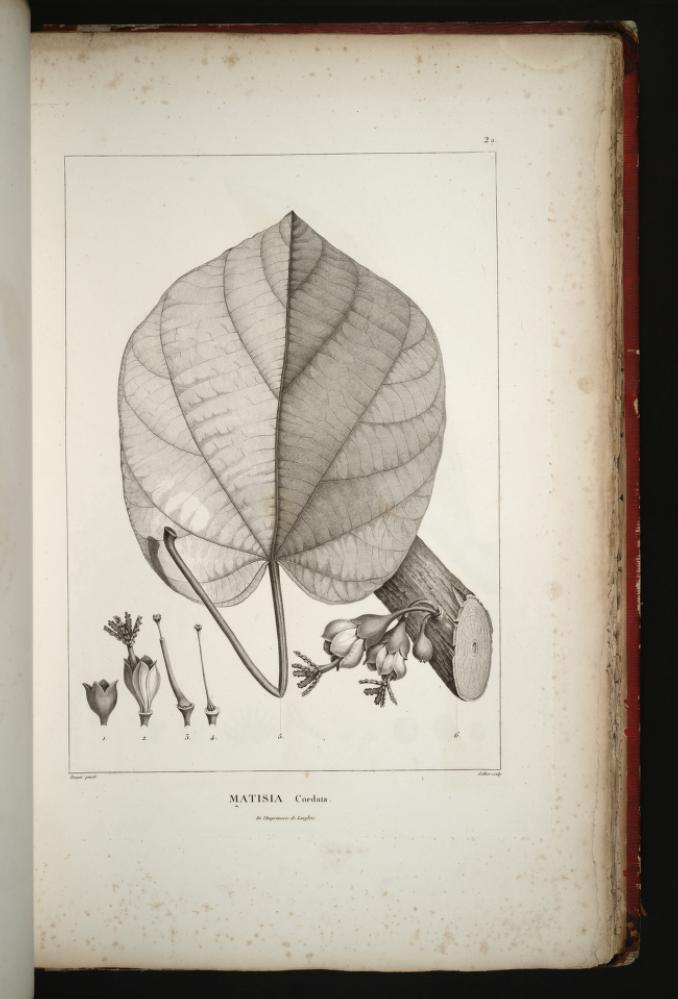
- Matisia cordata, Illustration.

Conservation status
- Least Concern (IUCN 3.1)

Scientific classification
- Kingdom: Plantae
- Clade: Embryophytes
- Clade: Tracheophytes
- Clade: Spermatophytes
- Clade: Angiosperms
- Clade: Eudicots
- Clade: Rosids
- Order: Malvales
- Family: Malvaceae
- Genus: Matisia
- Species: M. cordata

Binomial name
- Matisia cordata Bonpl.

Synonyms
- Quararibea cordata (Bonpl.) Vischer

= Matisia cordata =

Species of plant

Matisia cordata, known as the South American sapote or chupa-chupa, is a large, semi-deciduous fruit tree reaching heights of up to 45 meters. It is native to the Amazon rainforest vegetation in Bolivia, Brazil, Colombia, Ecuador, and Peru.

== Description ==
The tree produces orange-yellow fruits that are soft, juicy, and sweet, each containing 2-5 seeds. These fruits are typically consumed fresh by hand, although they can also be juiced.

Although generally popular, the fruit is variable in quality, as some trees may produce insipid or fibrous fruits. Little work has been done to establish preferred cultivars. Matisia cordata thrives in wet, deep soils, but it is susceptible to being killed by floods.

== Distribution ==
Matisia cordata is native to the foothills of the Andes and is commonly found throughout parts of Brazil, Venezuela, and Colombia, as well as rural southern Panama. However, it is not widely cultivated

Chupa-chupa has failed to gain much international recognition and has not been widely planted outside its native range. In 1964, US pomologist Bill Whitman obtained seeds from Peru and planted a tree in his garden at Bal Harbour, Florida, where it has successfully fruited.

== Gallery ==
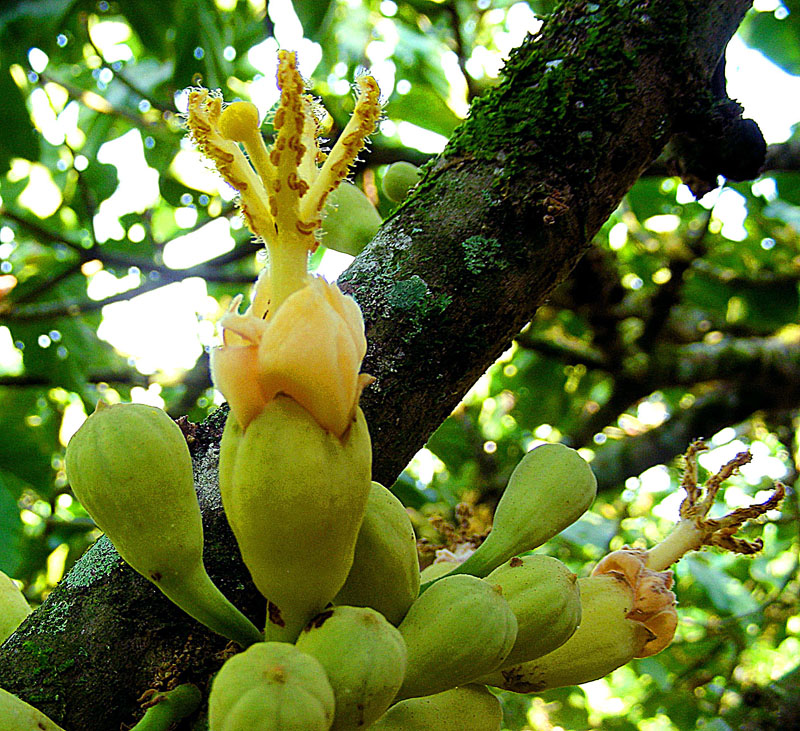
Flower

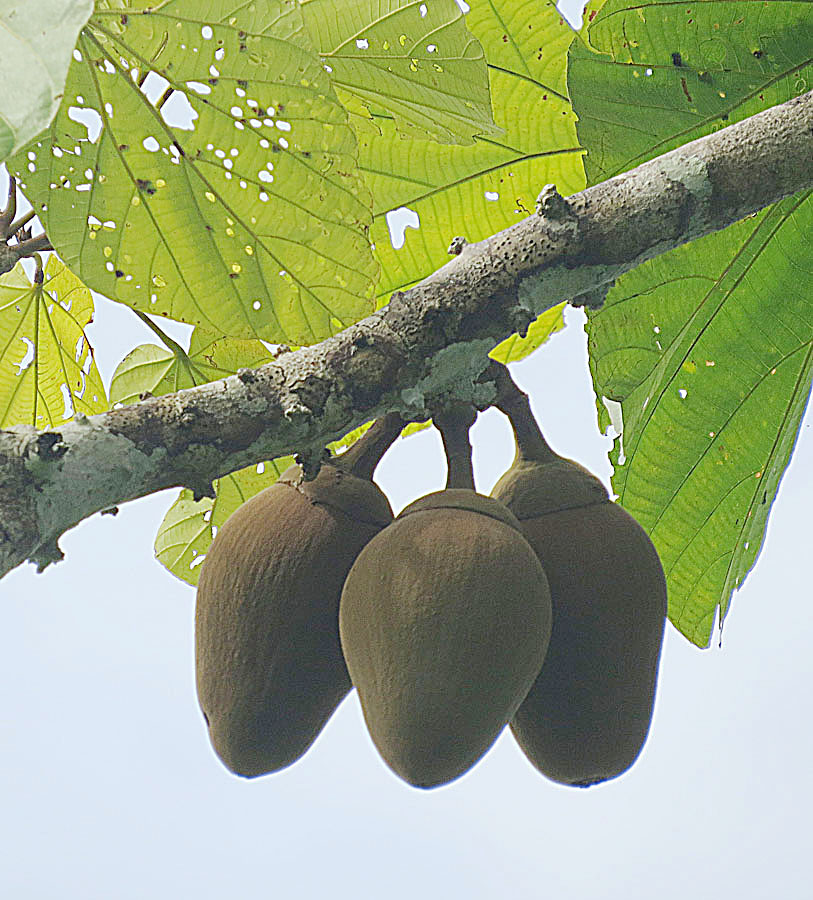

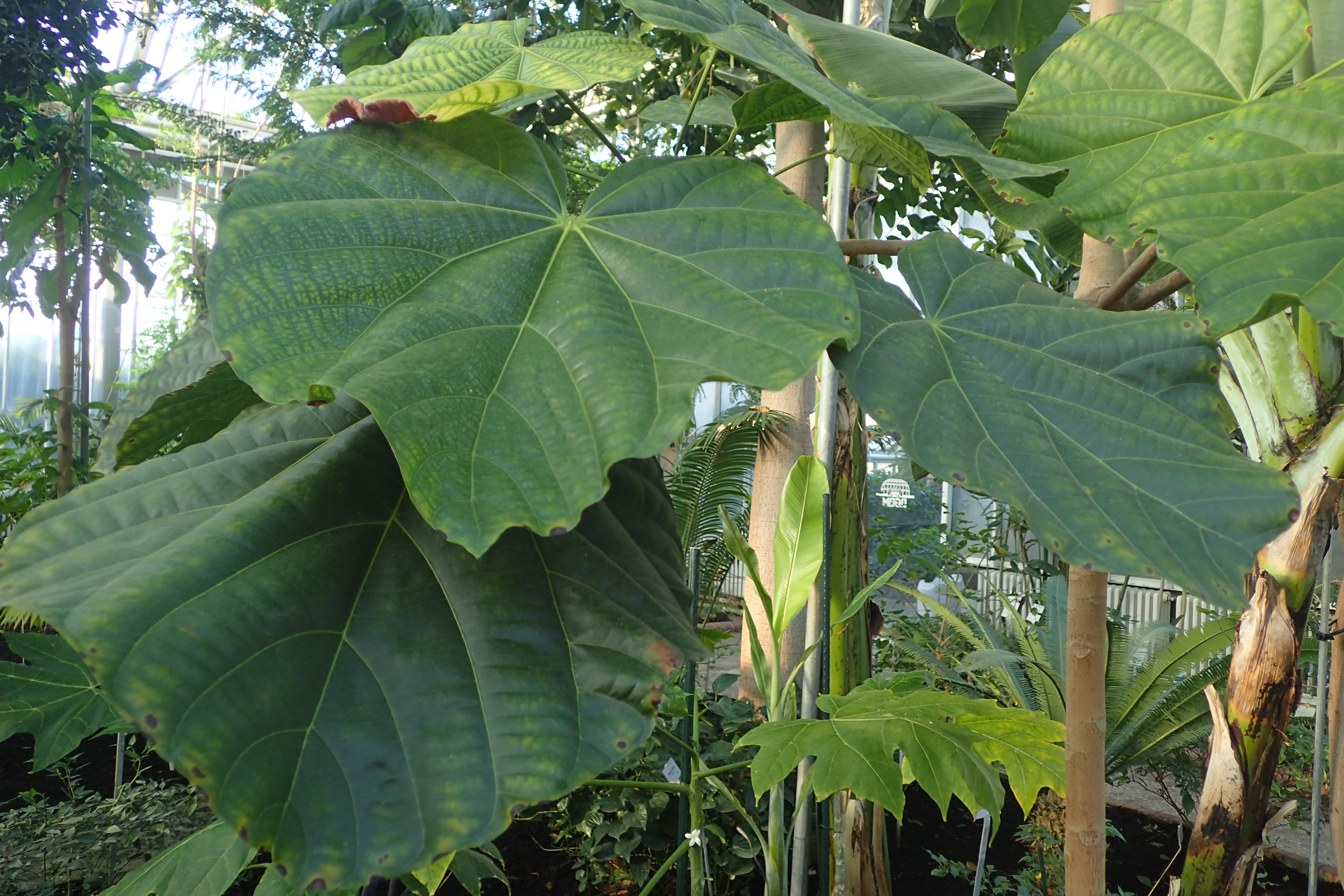

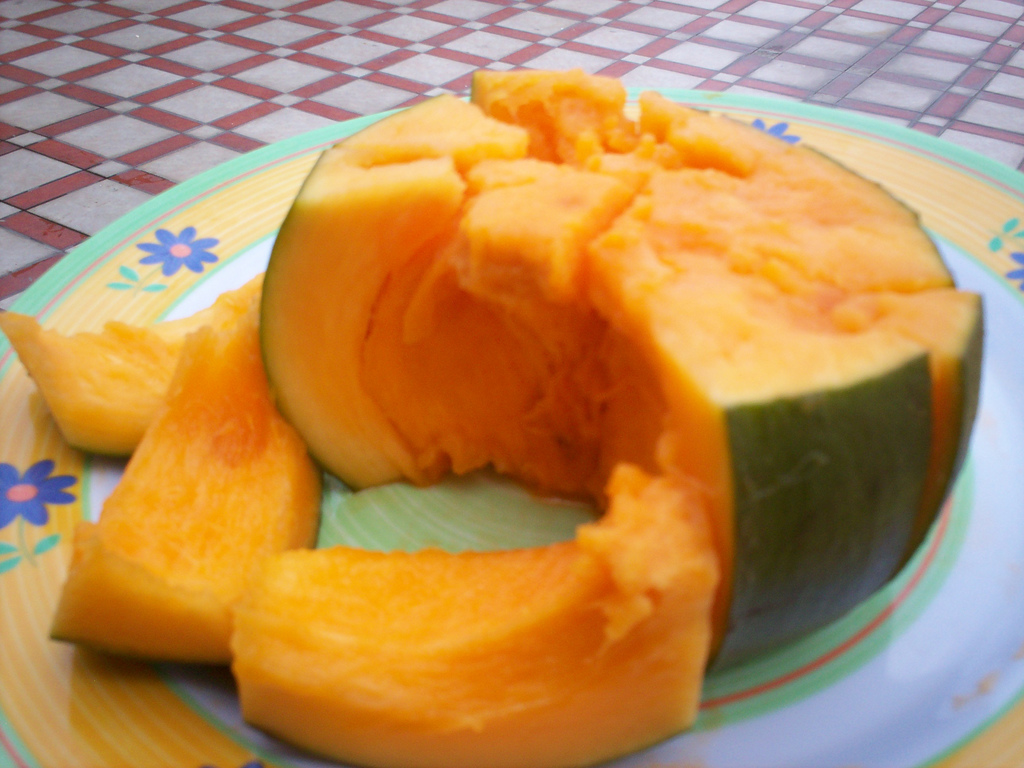

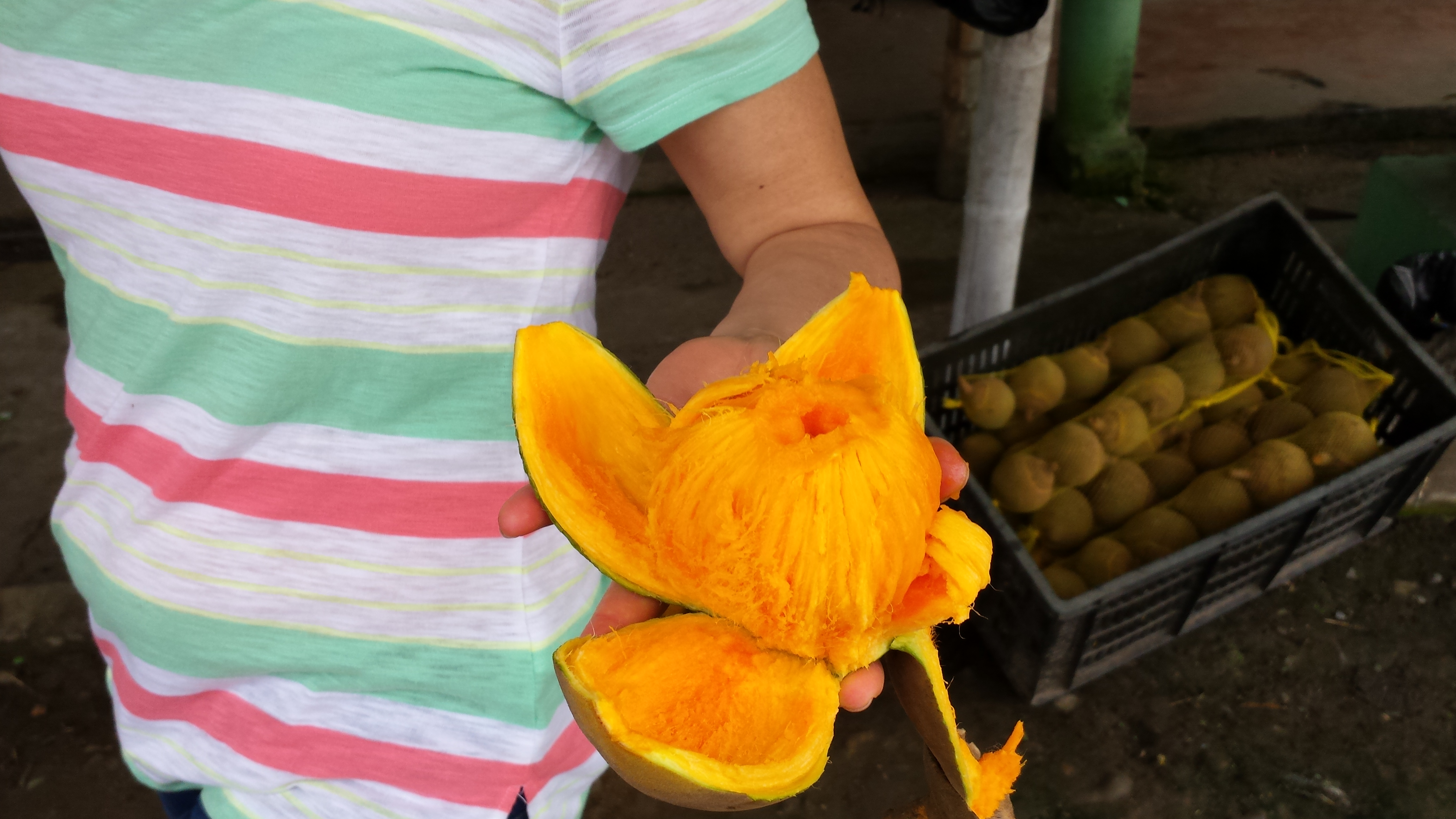

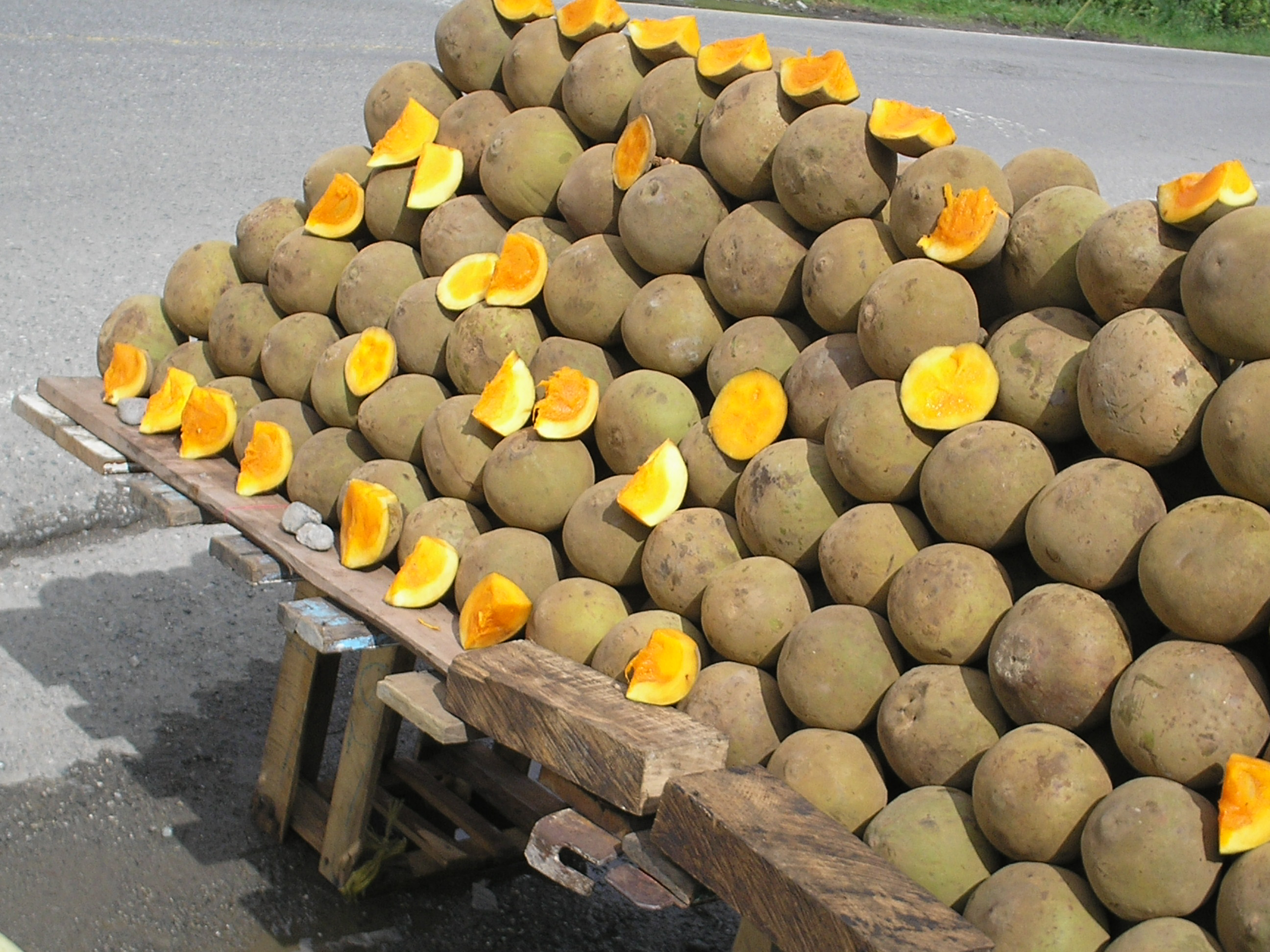
Fruit for sale
