= Oaxaca Ethnobotanical Garden =

Botanical garden in Oaxaca City, Mexico

Coordinates: 17.0666°N 96.7225°W

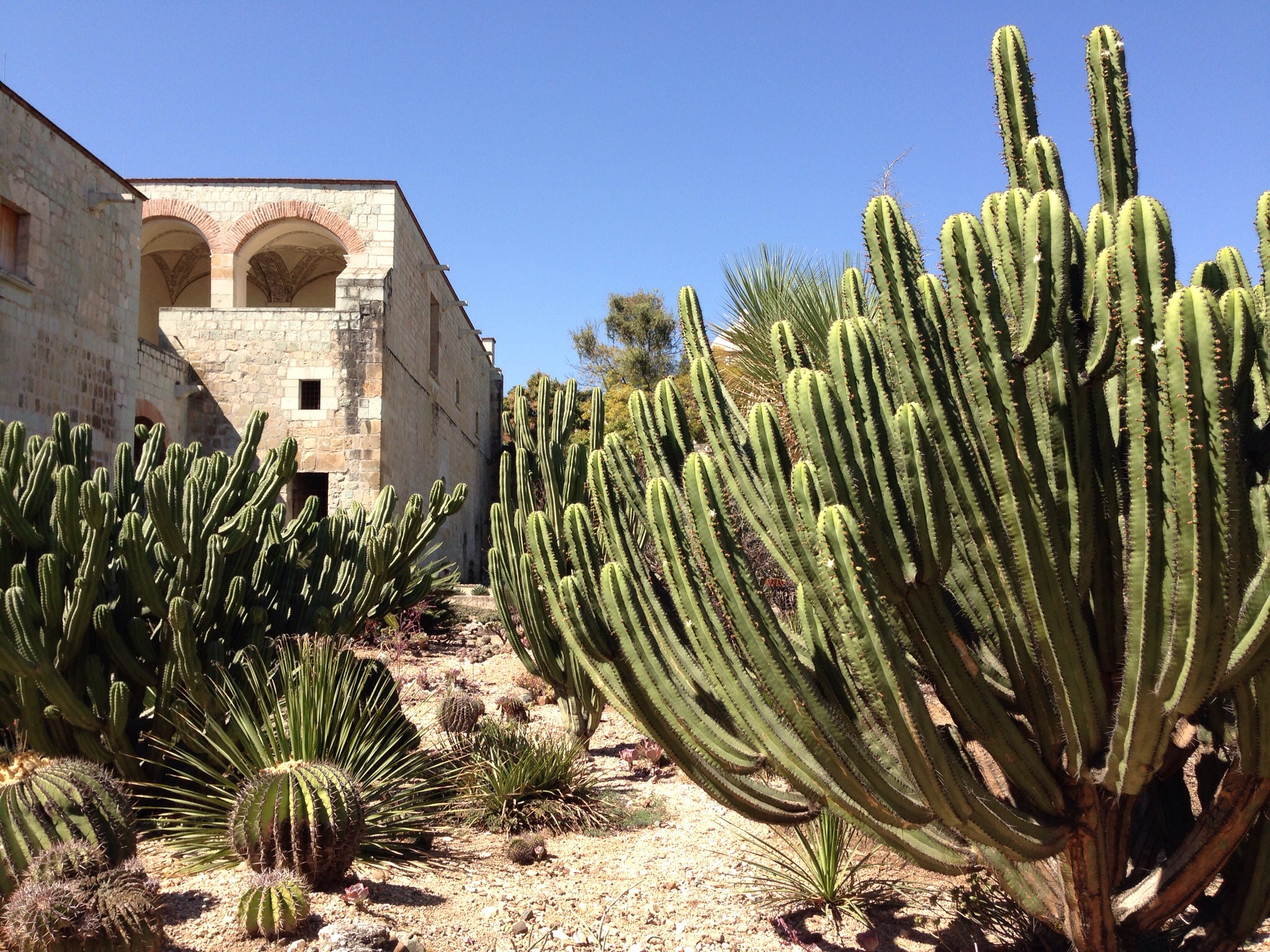
The Jardín Etnobotánico de Oaxaca contains numerous species of cactus and other plants native to Oaxaca.

The Jardín Etnobotánico de Oaxaca is a botanical garden in Oaxaca City, Mexico. It occupies 2.32 acres of land adjacent to the Church of Santo Domingo. It is administered by the state government of Oaxaca.

== History ==
In 1993, a proposal for the creation of the Ethnobotanical Garden was put forth by Francisco Toledo, a renowned artist from Oaxaca, and the civil association PRO-OAX (Board for the Defense and Conservation of the Cultural and Natural Heritage of Oaxaca, A.C.). Francisco Toledo was interested in preserving and promoting the traditional knowledge of the Zapotec and Mixtec peoples of the Oaxaca region. The artist was a constant activist and his struggles led him to win great and surprising battles, such as preventing, alongside ProOax, the conversion of the former Convent of Santo Domingo de Guzmán (a colonial-era building) into a large parking lot and managing to turn it into the current Santo Domingo Cultural Center, which houses the Museum of Cultures and the Ethnobotanical Garden.

Toledo collaborated with anthropologist Alejandro de Ávila Blomberg to design the garden, which showcases the rich diversity of plant species used by indigenous communities in the region for food, medicine, and cultural practices. The garden also includes an herbarium, a library, and a laboratory for the study of ethnobotany.

== Species ==
Some of the species found in the garden include:

- Agave: A genus of succulent plants that are used for various purposes, including the production of alcoholic beverages like mezcal and tequila. Species found at the garden include Agave salmiana and Agave potatorum.
- Cactus: A family of plants that are adapted to arid environments and are used for food, medicine, and ornamental purposes. Species found at the garden include the giant barrel cactus, Echinocactus platyacanthus, garambullo, Myrtillocactus schenckii, Mexican fence post cactus, Lophocereus marginatus, and various species of opuntia. Opuntia ficus-indica was domesticated as a spineless, easier to manage host for the cochineal insect, a source for a natural red dye produced exclusively in Oaxaca for some three centuries and which was exported all around the world. In fact, the building of the monastery on the grounds of which the Oaxaca Ethnobotanic garden now stands was funded by the sale of this dye. Both Opuntia ficus-indica and Stenocereus pruinosus produce edible fruit.
- Grains: Amaranth was an important staple food for the Aztecs and is still used today in various dishes. The garden also grows varieties of maize, including varieties of teosinte, its wild relatives.
- Flavoring plants: The garden grows a number of fragrant plants that are used to flavor traditional drinks like tejate and atole. These include vanilla, frangipani, Plumeria rubra, and the funeral tree, Quararibea funebris.
- Medicinal plants: The garden features a wide range of medicinal plants that are used in traditional medicine to treat various ailments. These include species of Equisetum, Dasylirion, Lysiloma, Phlebodium and Senecio.
- Fruit trees: The garden also includes a variety of fruit trees, such as sapodilla, Manilkara zapota, soursop, Annona muricata, mamey, Pouteria sapota, papaya, guava, and mango, which are important sources of food in the region.
- Other trees: Other trees in the garden include manila tamarind, Pithecellobium dulce, the kapok tree, Ceiba pentandra, montezuma cypress, Taxodium mucronatum, the gumbo-limbo tree, bursera simaruba, the shaving brush tree, Pseudobombax ellipticum, and the elephant ear tree, Enterolobium cyclocarpum.

The garden showcases the rich biodiversity of the region and the importance of plants to the local communities.

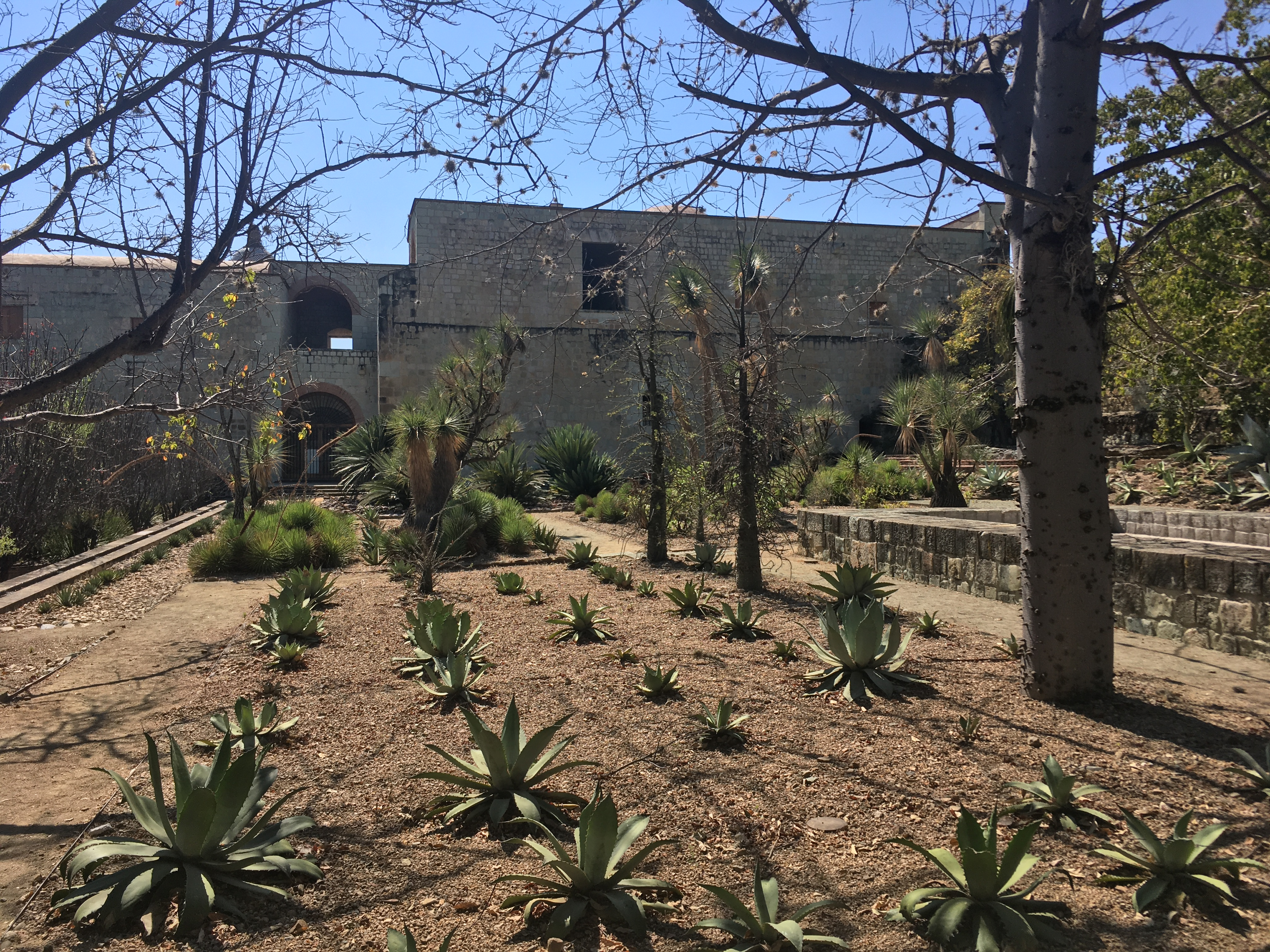
Agave is one of the species found in the Etnobotanical Garden in Oaxaca.
