= Panula =

Panula may refer to:

- Eino Viljami Panula (1911–1912), young Finnish boy who died during the sinking of the RMS Titanic
- Jorma Panula (born 1930), Finnish conductor, composer, and teacher of conducting
- Panula (moth), a genus of moths found in Mexico and the Dominican Republic
- Panula (Southern Ostrobothnia), Finland
- Panula (tree), a timber tree of South and Central America, Quararibea asterolepis
