= Cinco dedos =

Common name for plant species

Cinco dedos (Spanish for five fingers) is a common name for several plants and may refer to:

- Quararibea asterolepis, a timber tree
- Quararibea pterocalyx, a species of flowering plant
