= Wild palm =

Wild palm is a common name for several plants and may refer to:

- Wild plants of the palm family, Arecaceae
- Quararibea pterocalyx, in the family Malvaceae

== See also ==
- Wild Palms (disambiguation)
