= Molinillo =

Molinillo may refer to:

- Quararibea grandifolia, commonly known as molinillo, a species of tree native to Colombia and Ecuador
- Molinillo, Spain a town in Salamanca Province, Spain
- Molinillo (whisk), a traditional Mexican whisk
