= Pixtle =

Processed seed of the mamey sapote fruit

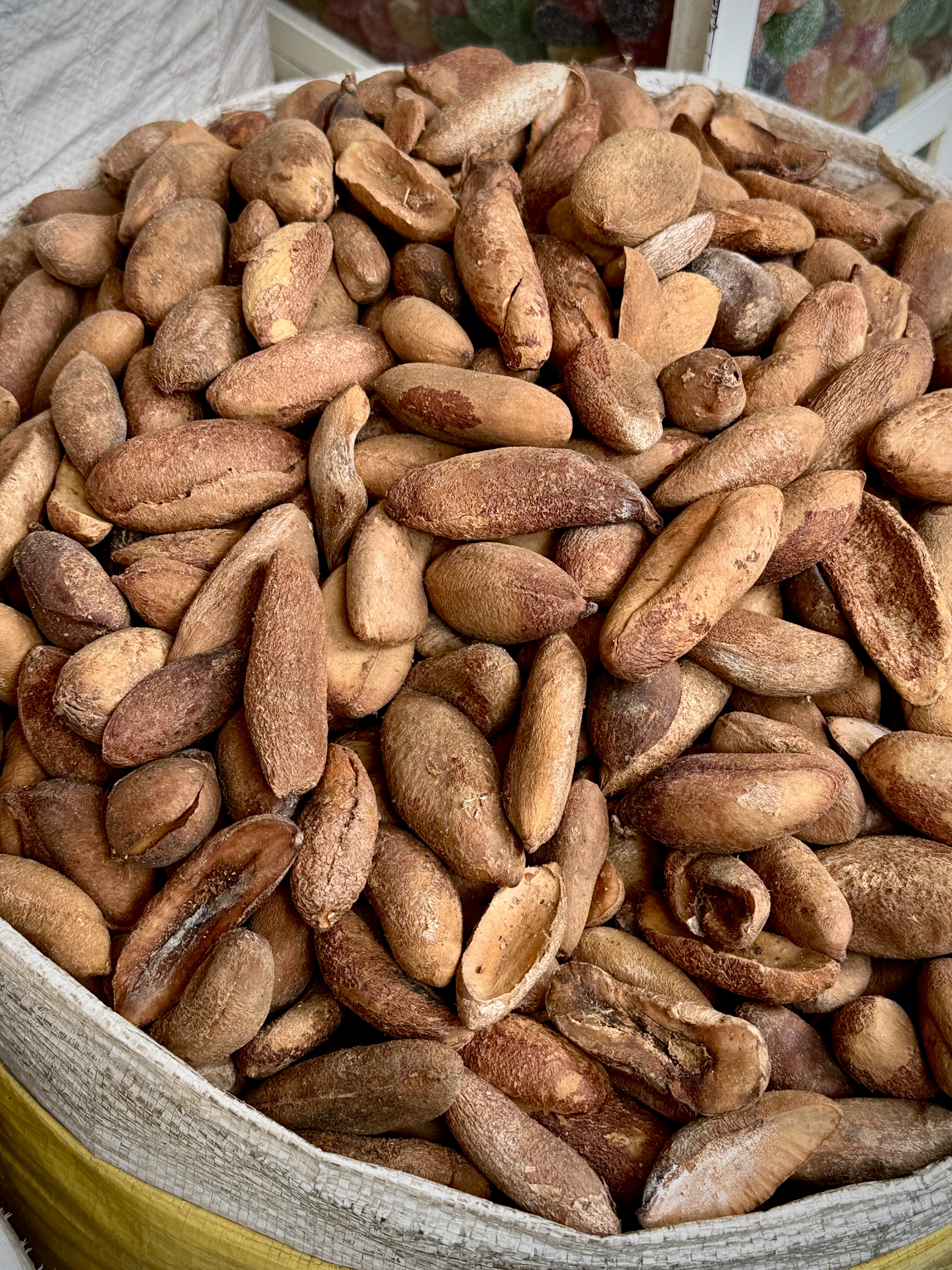

Pixtle is the name given to the processed seed of the mamey sapote (Pouteria sapota), a tropical tree native to Mexico and Central America. The seed is encased within the mamey sapote fruit, which is known for its sweet, creamy flesh. The term "pixtle" comes from the Nahuatl word "pitztli", meaning "pit (of a fruit)" or "seed".

== Use ==
Pixtle, the name given to the mamey seed after it has been treated and processed, has a significant role in traditional Mexican cuisine, particularly in the preparation of beverages, desserts, and regional dishes. It is often used to flavor traditional drinks such as atole, tejate, or added to other chocolate-based beverages. The flavor of the Pixtle is described as slightly bitter and nutty, providing a contrast to the sweetness of the mamey flesh. The aroma is often compared to that of almonds or almond extract. Pixtle is traditionally used in tejate, a pre-Hispanic beverage that contains ingredients such as roasted corn flour, fermented cacao beans, and rosita de cacao. Tejate is still sold in local markets and served at festivals across Mexico.

== Potential toxicity ==
Like many seeds from the Sapotaceae family, the mamey sapote seed contains trace amounts of toxic compounds. However, when used in traditional culinary practices as pixtle, the seeds are processed in ways that reduce their toxicity, such as soaking and cooking. Caution is advised when consuming mamey sapote seeds in any form.
