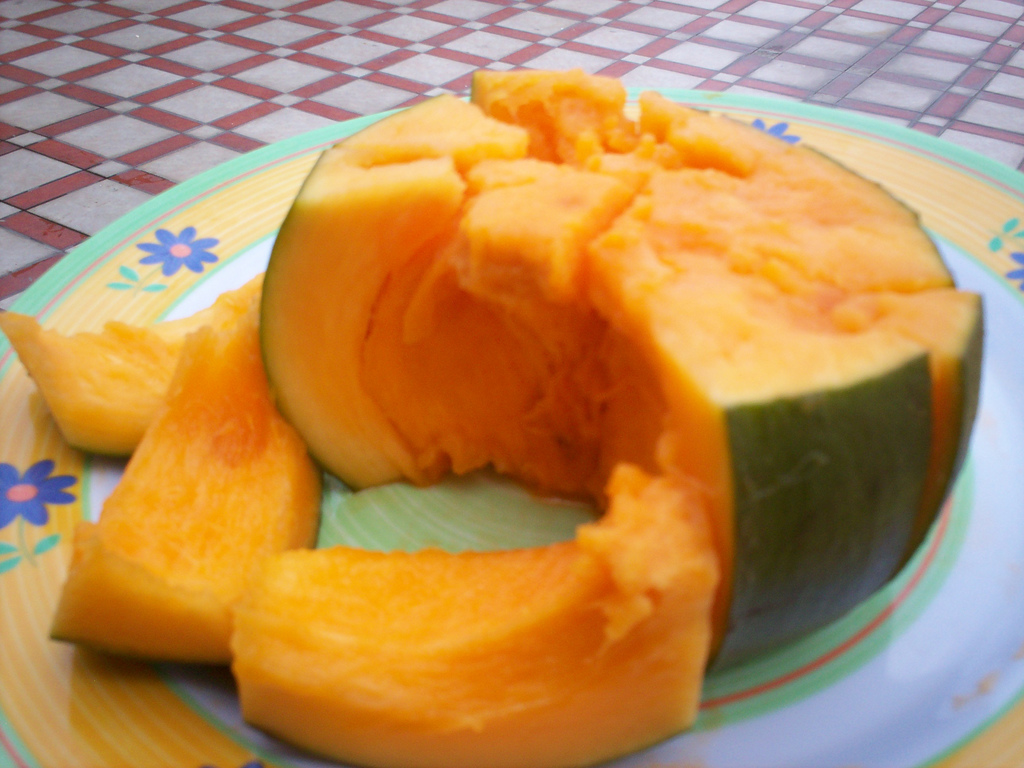
- Fruit of Quararibea cordata

Scientific classification
- Kingdom: Plantae
- Clade: Tracheophytes
- Clade: Angiosperms
- Clade: Eudicots
- Clade: Rosids
- Order: Malvales
- Family: Malvaceae
- Subfamily: Bombacoideae
- Genus: Quararibea; Aubl.

Species
- See text

Synonyms
- Gerbera J.F.Gmel., orth. var.; Gerberia Scop.; Lexarza La Llave; Myrodia Sw.

= Quararibea =

Genus of flowering plants

Quararibea is a genus of flowering plants in the family Malvaceae. It includes 61 species native to the tropical Americas, ranging from Mexico through Central and South America to Bolivia and southeastern Brazil.

== Species ==
61 species are accepted.

- Quararibea aliciae Fern.Alonso
- Quararibea alversonii C.D.M.Ferreira, Bovini & Baumgratz
- Quararibea amazonica Ulbr.
- Quararibea angustifolia (Mart.) C.D.M.Ferreira & Bovini
- Quararibea aristeguietae Cuatrec.
- Quararibea asterolepis Pittier
- Quararibea aurantiocalyx W.S.Alverson
- Quararibea bilobata A.Robyns
- Quararibea bovinii C.D.M.Ferreira
- Quararibea bragae C.D.M.Ferreira & Bovini
- Quararibea cacao (Triana & Planch.) Baill.
- Quararibea caldasiana Fern.Alonso
- Quararibea calycoptera Fern.Alonso & Cornejo
- Quararibea casasecae Fern.Alonso & Castrov.
- Quararibea centinelae Fern.Alonso & Cornejo
- Quararibea ciroana Cuatrec.
- Quararibea citarensis Fern.Alonso
- Quararibea cogolloi Fern.Alonso
- Quararibea cornejoi Fern.Alonso
- Quararibea costaricensis W.S.Alverson
- Quararibea cryptantha Fern.Alonso
- Quararibea duckei Huber
- Quararibea floribunda (A.St.-Hil. & Naudin) K.Schum.
- Quararibea foenigraeca Cuatrec.
- Quararibea funebris (La Llave) Vischer
- Quararibea gentlei Lundell
- Quararibea gigantiflora Pittier
- Quararibea gomeziana W.S.Alverson
- Quararibea grandifolia (Little) Cuatrec.
- Quararibea guianensis Aubl.
- Quararibea latilimbata Fern.Alonso
- Quararibea lopezperaltae Gallardo-Hern. & Lorea-Hern.
- Quararibea magnifica Pittier
- Quararibea martini Baill.
- Quararibea mayarum Lorea-Hern. & Gallardo-Hern.
- Quararibea nigrescens N.Zamora, Cascante & S.Y.Kim
- Quararibea obovalifolia Pittier
- Quararibea parviflora Lundell
- Quararibea parvifolia Standl.
- Quararibea pendula W.S.Alverson
- Quararibea penduliflora (A.St.-Hil.) K.Schum.
- Quararibea platyphylla Pittier & Donn.Sm.
- Quararibea pterocalyx Hemsl.
- Quararibea pumila W.S.Alverson
- Quararibea rangelii Fern.Alonso
- Quararibea recondita Fern.Alonso
- Quararibea reflexipetala Cascante, J.Sánchez-Gonz. & W.S.Alverson
- Quararibea ruiziana Fern.Alonso
- Quararibea santaritensis W.S.Alverson
- Quararibea silverstonei Fern.Alonso
- Quararibea similis C.D.M.Ferreira & Bovini
- Quararibea spatulata Ducke
- Quararibea stenophylla Pittier
- Quararibea steyermarkii Cuatrec.
- Quararibea tafallae Fern.Alonso
- Quararibea tulekunae Fern.Alonso
- Quararibea turbinata (Sw.) Poir. – swizzlestick tree
- Quararibea velutina Cuatrec.
- Quararibea villanuevae Fern.Alonso
- Quararibea wittii K.Schum. & Ulbr.
- Quararibea yunckeri Standl.

=== Formerly placed here ===
- Matisia cordata Bonpl. (as Q. cordata (Bonpl.) Vischer)
- Matisia dolichopoda (A.Robyns) Cuatrec. (as Q. dolichopoda A.Robyns)
- Matisia dolichosiphon (A.Robyns & S.Nilsson) W.S.Alverson (as Q. dolichosiphon A.Robyns & S.Nilsson)
- Matisia jefensis (A.Robyns & S.Nilsson) W.S.Alverson (as Q. jefensis A.Robyns & S.Nilsson)
- Matisia sanblasensis (A.Robyns) Cuatrec. (as Q. sanblasensis A.Robyns)
