= Church of Santo Domingo de Guzmán =

Church in Oaxaca, Mexico

Templo de Santo Domingo de Guzmán
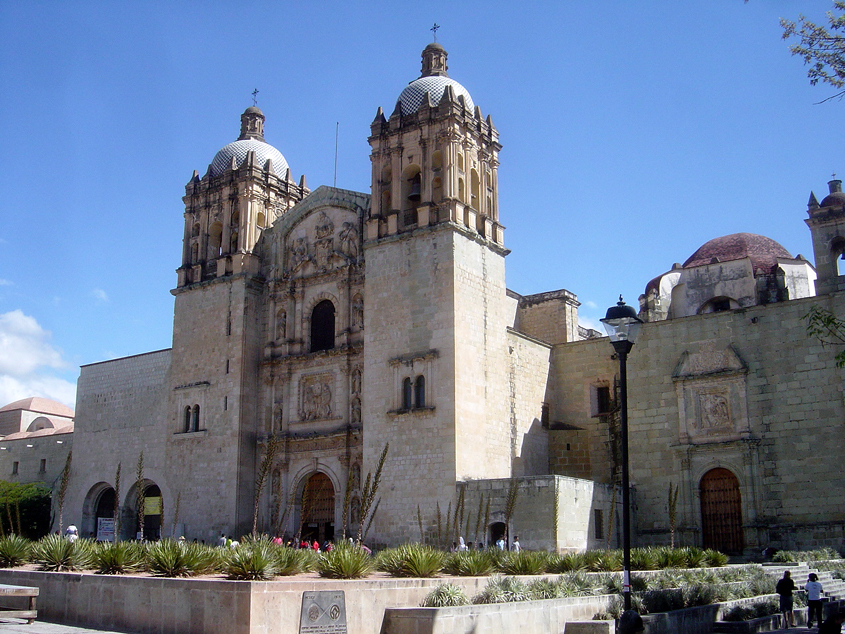
- Santo Domingo de Guzmán

Religion
- Affiliation: Roman Catholic
- Province: Archdiocese of Antequera, Oaxaca
- Rite: Latin Rite

Location
- Location: Oaxaca de Juárez, Mexico
- Interactive map of Templo de Santo Domingo de Guzmán
- Coordinates: 17°03′56″N 96°43′23″W

Architecture
- Type: Latin Cross
- Style: Baroque
- Groundbreaking: 1572
- Completed: 1724
- Materials: Cantera

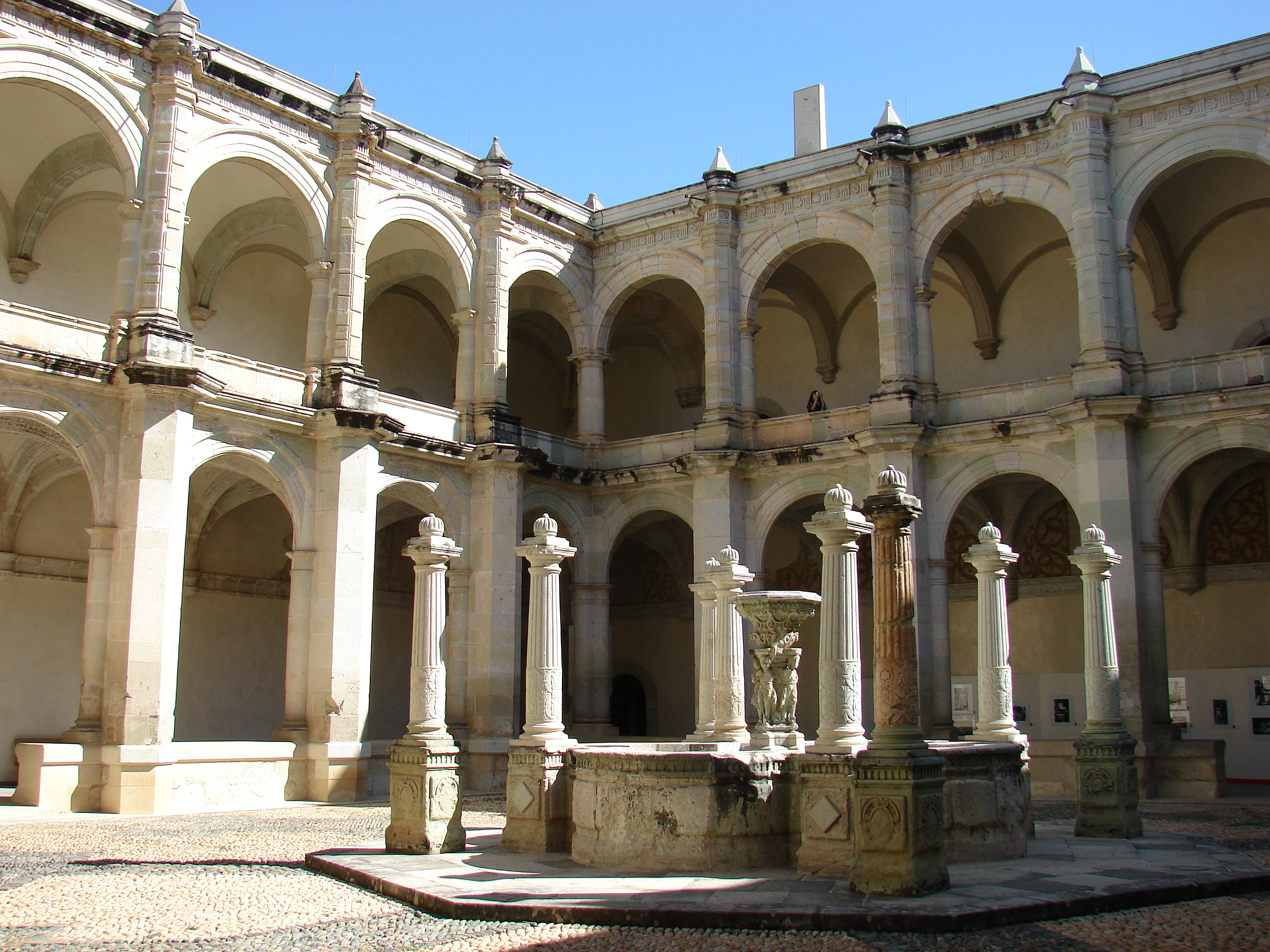
Main cloister

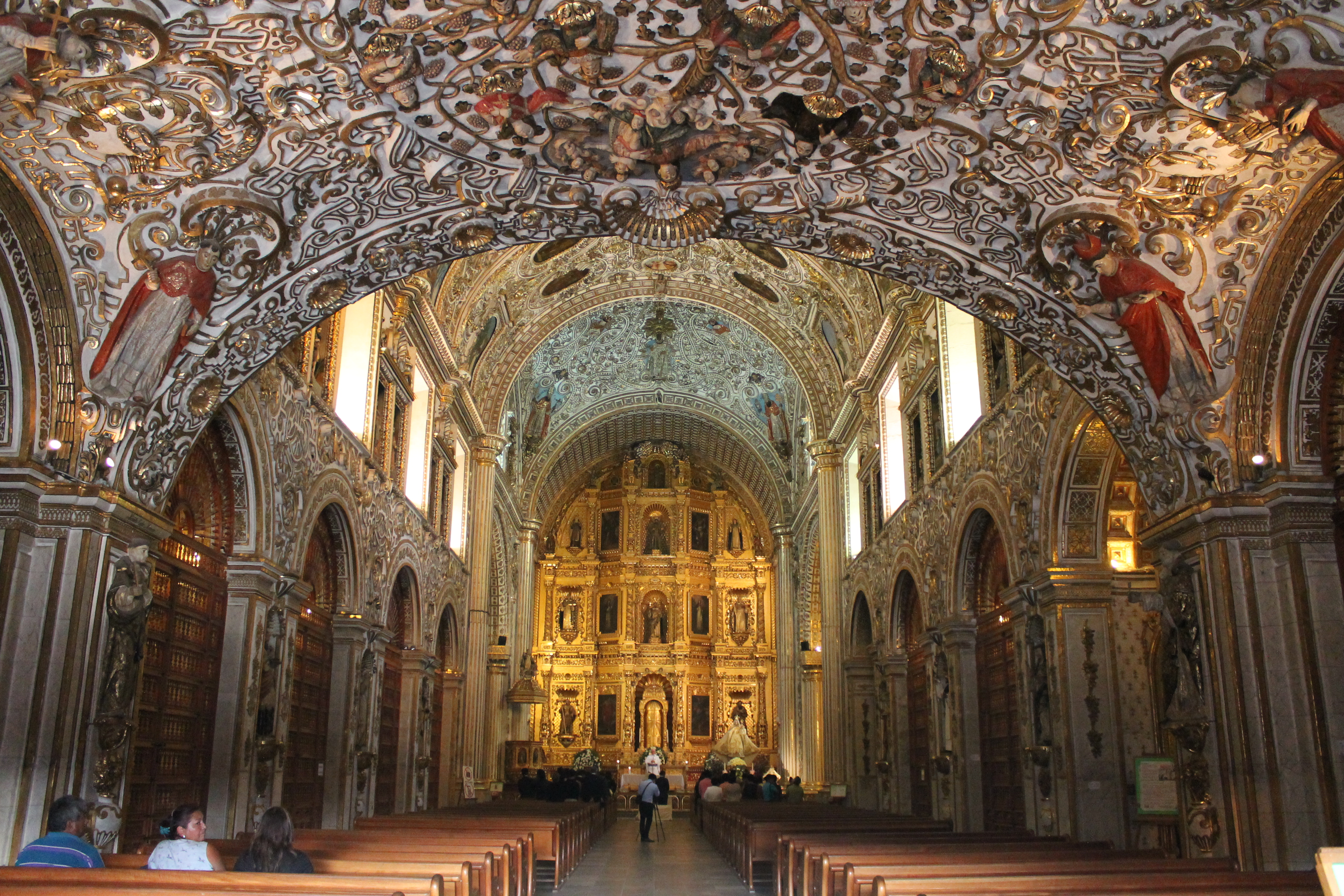
Colonial interior of the church

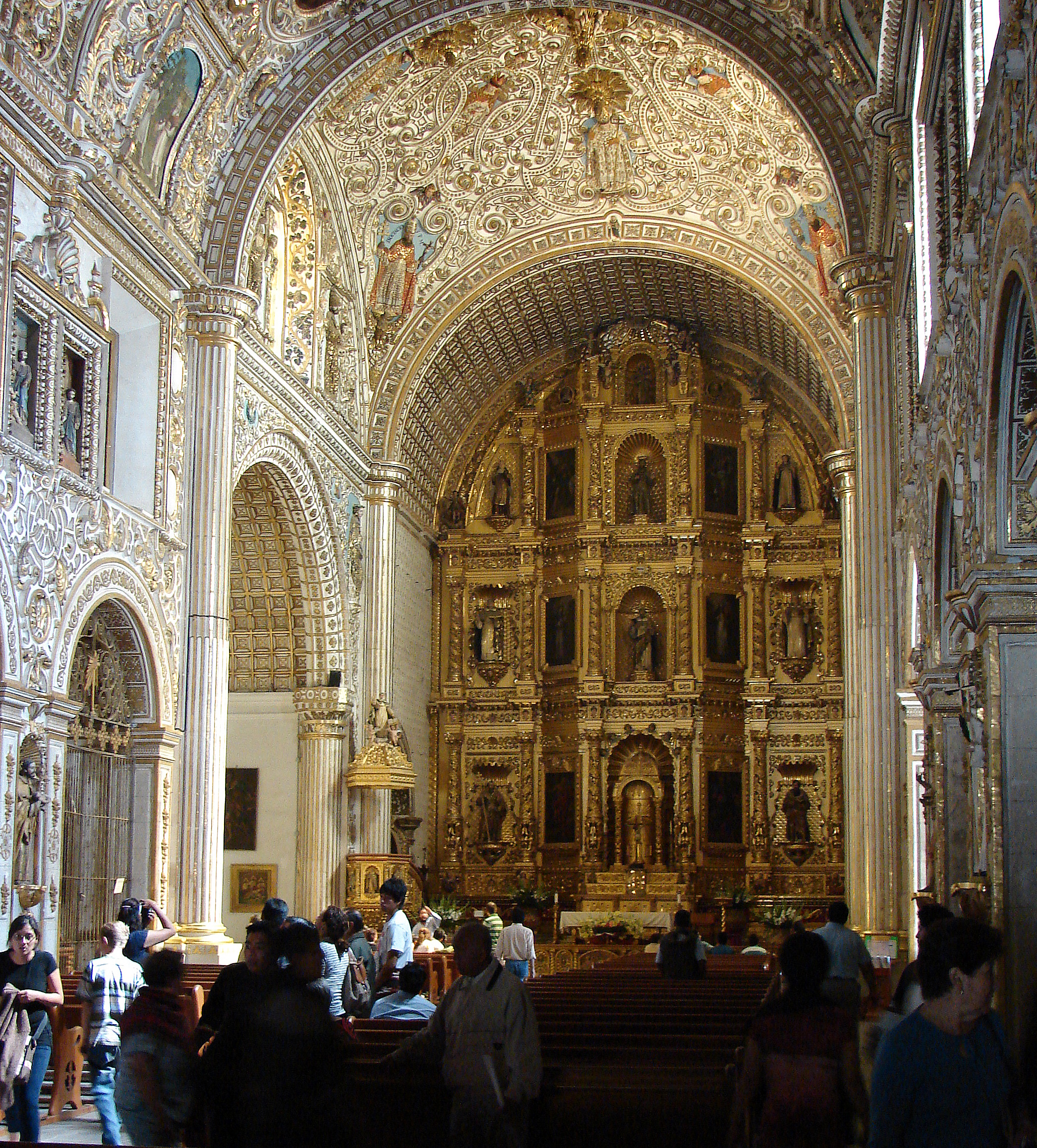
Altarpiece

The Church and Convent of Santo Domingo de Guzmán (Spanish: Templo de Santo Domingo de Guzmán) in the city of Oaxaca de Juárez (Mexico) is an example of New Spanish Baroque architecture. The first construction projects for the building date back to 1551, when the Antequera de Oaxaca's City Council ceded a total of twenty-four lots to the Dominican Order for the construction of a convent in the city. However, it was not until 1608 that the conventual complex of Santo Domingo was inaugurated, still unfinished.

Throughout its history, the Convent of Santo Domingo has been the scene of several important events in the history of Mexico: it was converted into a military warehouse, a stable, closed to Catholic worship in times of Jacobin secularism of the governments emanating from the Reform War, and then returned again to the Church by agreement of Porfirio Díaz. In 1979 it received the visit of the Catholic pontiff John Paul II, and was later declared —along with the entire Historic Center of Oaxaca— a World Heritage Site by UNESCO.

== History ==
The first Dominicans arrived in Oaxaca at the end of 1528. More or less at the same time, the site of the indigenous town of Huaxyacac was erected in Villa de Antequera, by decree of King Charles V, Holy Roman Emperor. Later, in 1551, the town council granted the Dominicans some land located in the vicinity of the Cerro del Fortín hill for the purpose of building a convent. Although the original agreement committed the Dominican order to complete the works within a period of no more than twenty years, in 1572 the construction had not advanced too much. After some negotiations, the City Council extended the term for thirty more years, in exchange for the Dominicans supporting the financing of the drinking water supply works for the city. In the following thirty years, the construction of the building continued with its ups and downs, due to the fact that the Order did not have sufficient financial resources.

Two earthquakes at the beginning of the 17th century (the first, in 1603, and the second, in 1604) destroyed the Convent of San Pablo of Oaxaca, a fact that motivated the acceleration of the works of Santo Domingo. Four years later, the convent complex was formally inaugurated, and in 1623 the establishment was elevated to the category of university, where philosophy and theology courses were taught. The final works of the temple were concluded in 1666, when the decoration of the same was finalized. The last modification to the building occurred in 1724, the year in which the construction of the Chapel del Rosario began.

As of 1812, the Church of Santo Domingo and its annexed convent were occupied by the hosts of the different armies of the factions that disputed the control of the country. In this way, it was occupied by the royalist Army and the Insurgent Army during the Mexican War of Independence; and then by centralists and federalists throughout the nineteenth century until the arrival of Benito Juárez as president of Mexico.

In 1859, with the application of the Iglesias Law, the convent and the church of Santo Domingo were destined for the use of the Mexican Army. Seven years later, in 1866, Catholicism was suspended by the federal government, until in 1902 it was returned to the Church by President Porfirio Díaz.

== Description ==
The front of the church is of three bodies and topped, in which Saint Dominic and Saint Hippolitus emerge holding a temple on which the Holy Spirit descends. The two bell towers have arched openings and four columns attached to each side, with fluted shafts and crowned with a pinnacle. Its domes are covered with azulejos and display small cups with lanterns.

Santo Domingo is an architectural complex that includes the temple itself, which currently continues to provide religious services for the Catholic community of the city of Oaxaca, and the annexed convent that is the headquarters of the Regional Museum of Oaxaca. The Convent of Santo Domingo currently houses an important museum collection made up of historical objects from the state of Oaxaca. One of the most important collections is that of the artistic objects discovered by Alfonso Caso in Tomb 7 of Monte Albán, belonging to the Mixtec culture. Another part of the convent currently houses the Oaxaca Ethnobotanical Garden, made up of plant species native to the state.

To access both the convent and the temple, it is necessary to cross a small square. This square is used as a stage for some popular festivals and other entertainment. Plaza de Santo Domingo is located half a kilometer from the main square of the city, with which it is connected through the Macedonio Alcalá Tourist Corridor, which is a cobblestone street that is very popular among tourists who visit Oaxaca de Juárez. As an anecdote, it is that when the sun is setting, the whole church is illuminated, and you can really appreciate all the architecture.

== Museum ==
The rooms that formerly constituted the convent now house the Cultural Centre of Oaxaca, which was founded with the help of Oaxacan-born artist Francisco Toledo. This museum includes an important collection of pre-Columban artefacts, among them the contents of Tomb 7 from the nearby Zapotec site of Monte Albán. The former monastery garden is now an ethnobotanical garden, containing a large collection of plants native to the region.

The entrance to both church and museum is across a wide plaza that acts as a center for local fiestas and other entertainments. It is located about half a kilometre north of the central squares of the city, the Zócalo and the Alameda, and the connecting street is pedestrianised, so it is a popular place for both tourists and local residents to stroll.

== Additional images ==
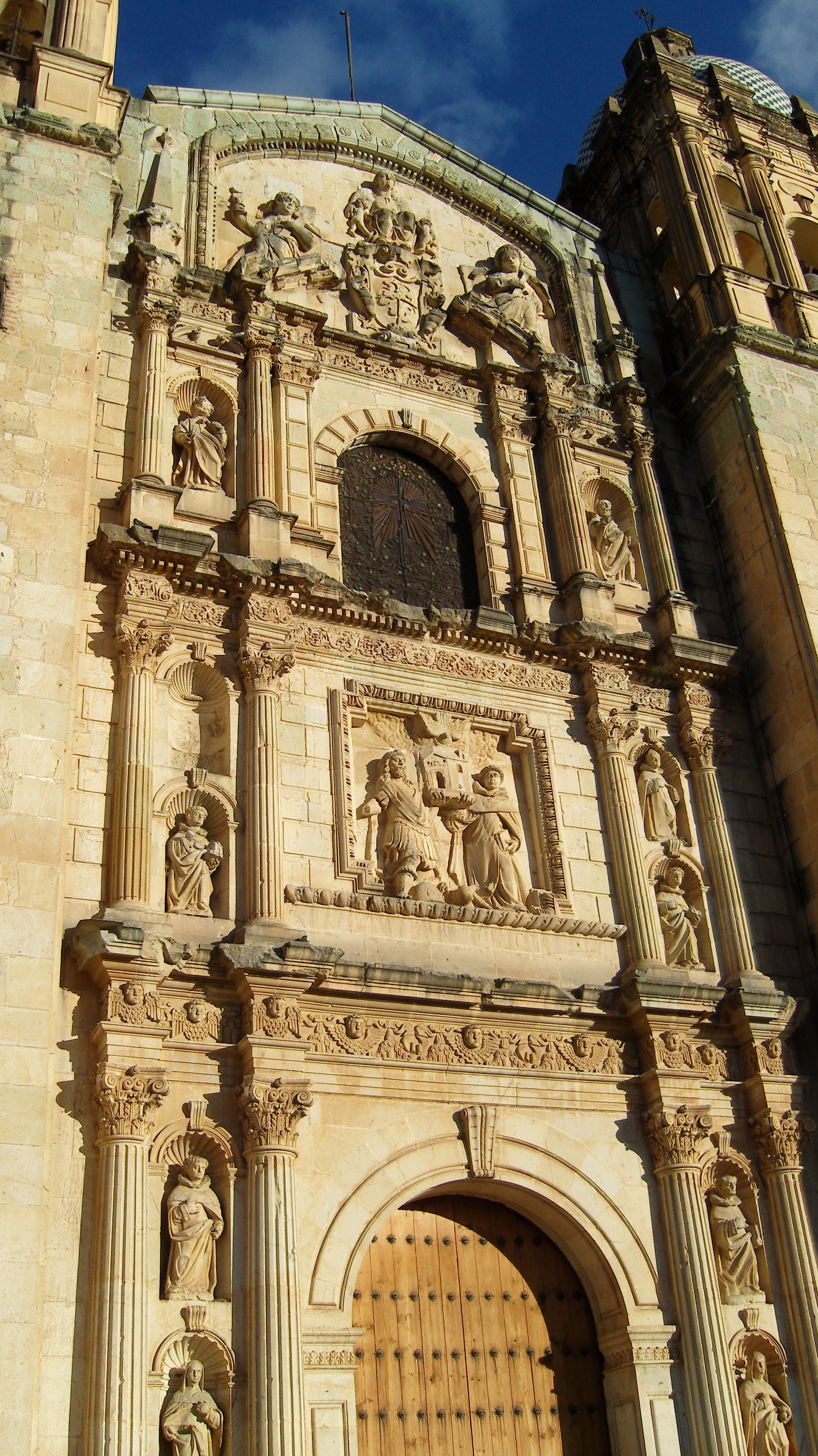
Facade of Church of Santo Domingo

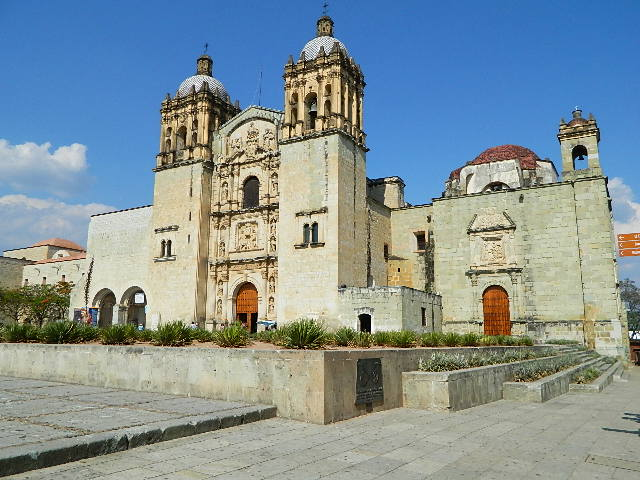
Church and convent

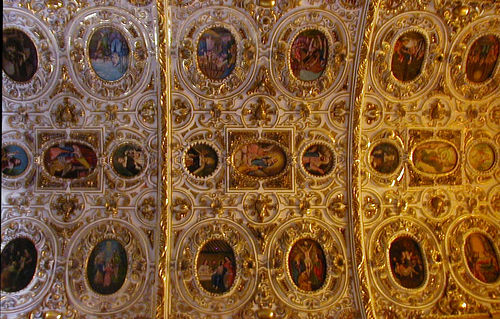
Ceiling of Church of Santo Domingo

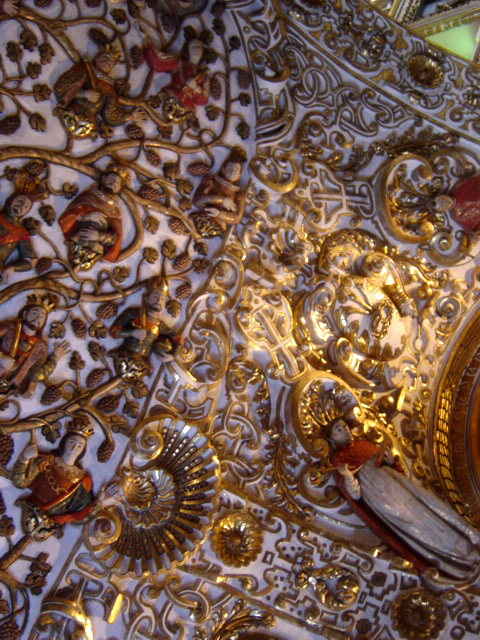
Ceiling Detail, Church of Santo Domingo

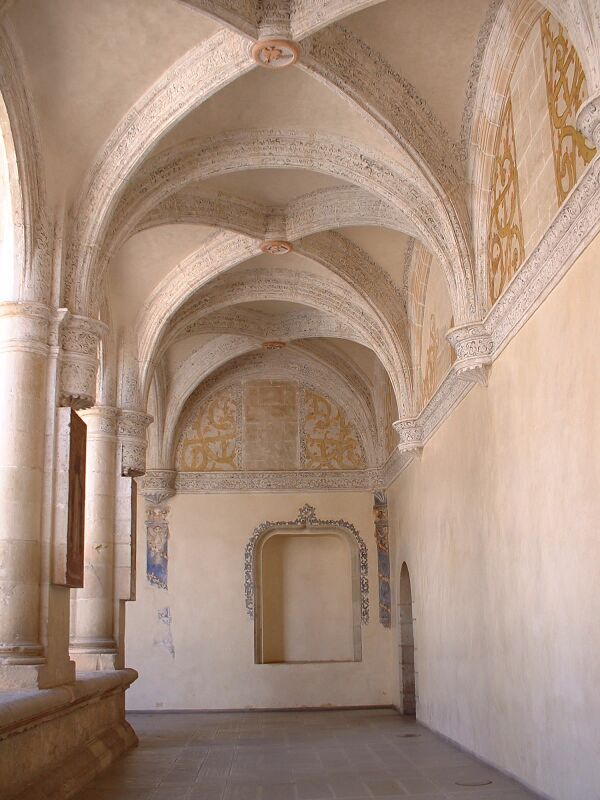
Cloister in the former monastery. Note the restoration of the painted decoration

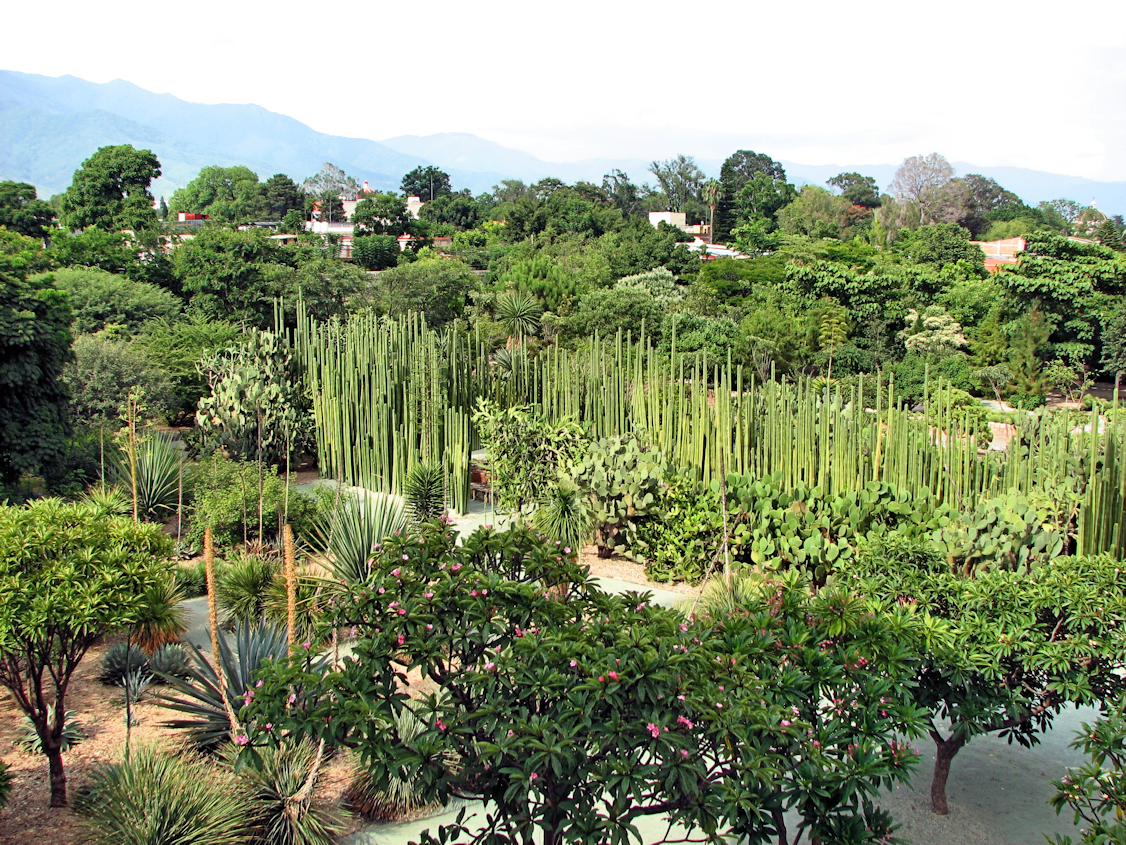
The former convent garden, now maintained as an ethnobotanical garden.

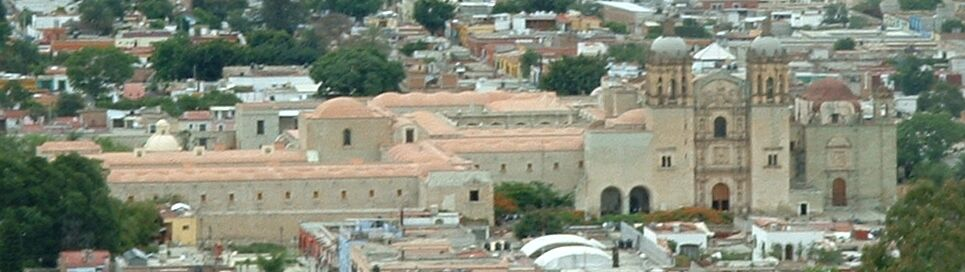
Santo Domingo Church and Monastery Complex

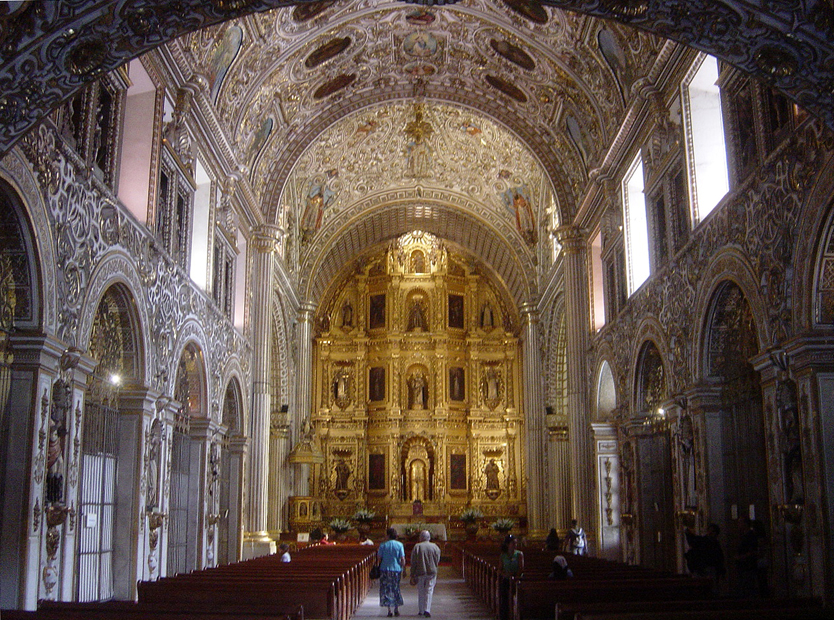
Interior, Church of Santo Domingo

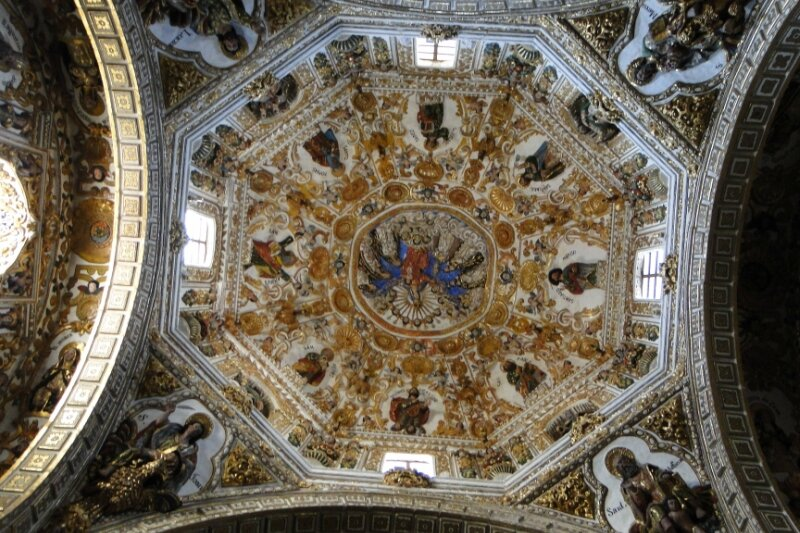
Dome decoration

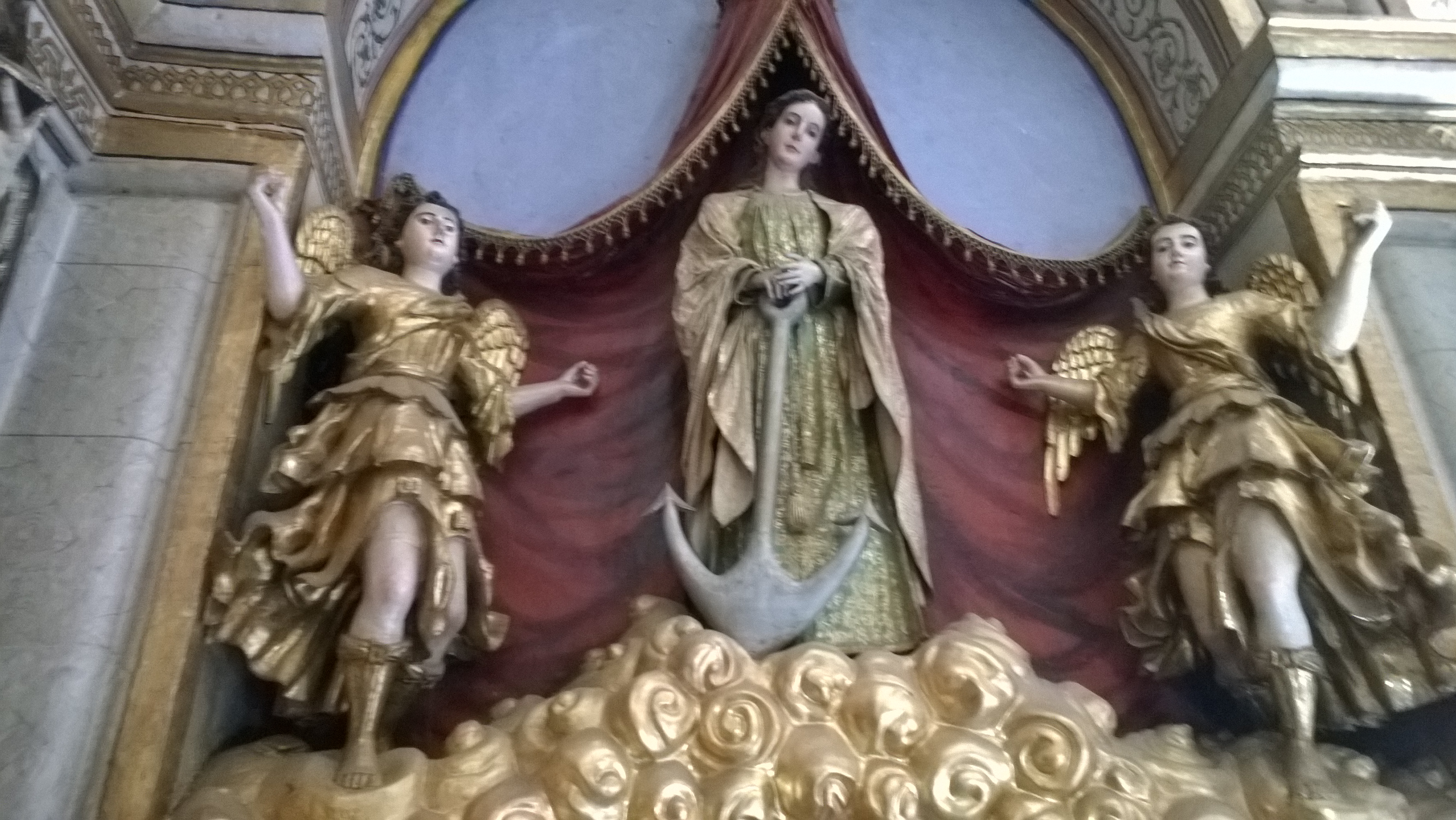
Detail

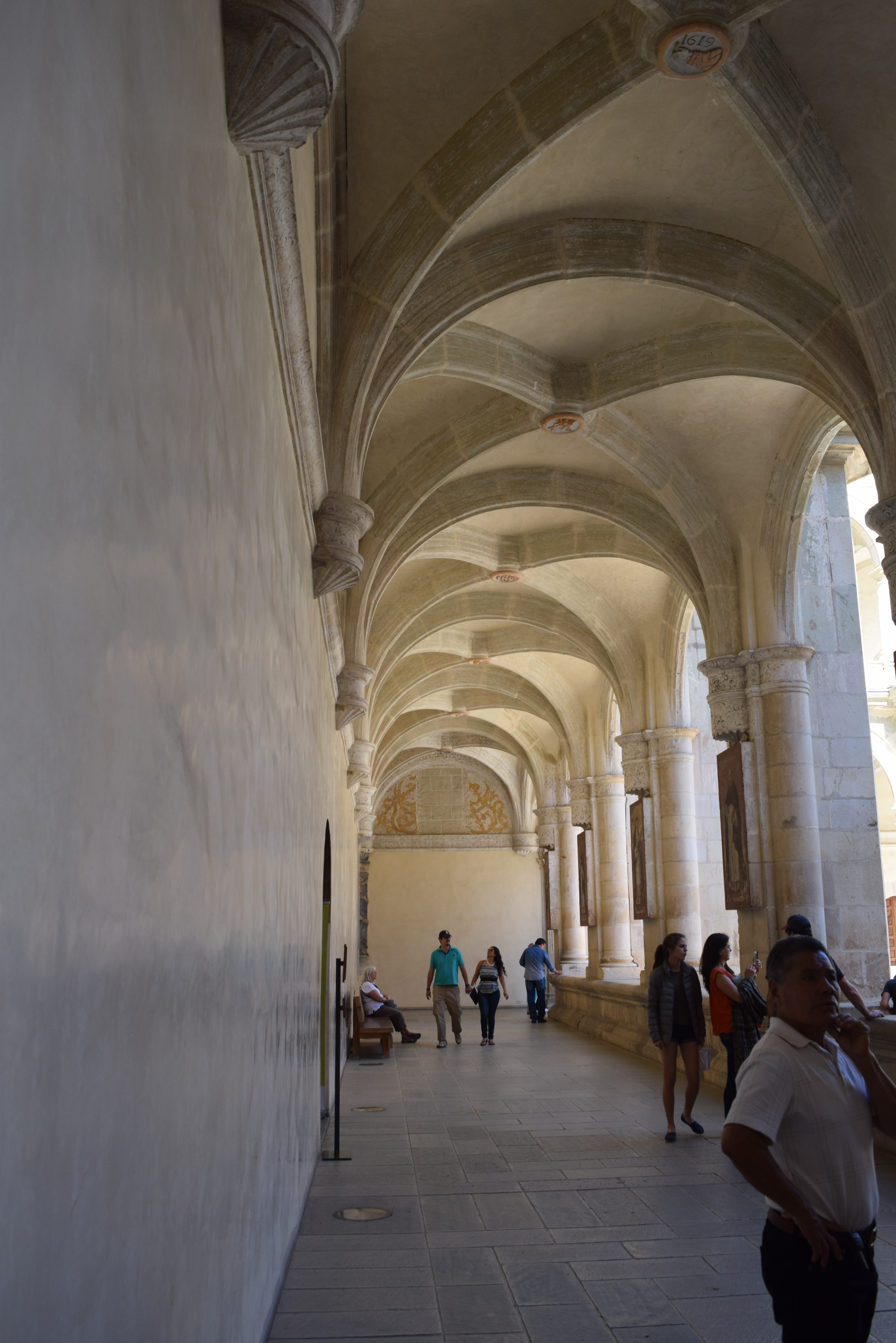
Cloister hall
