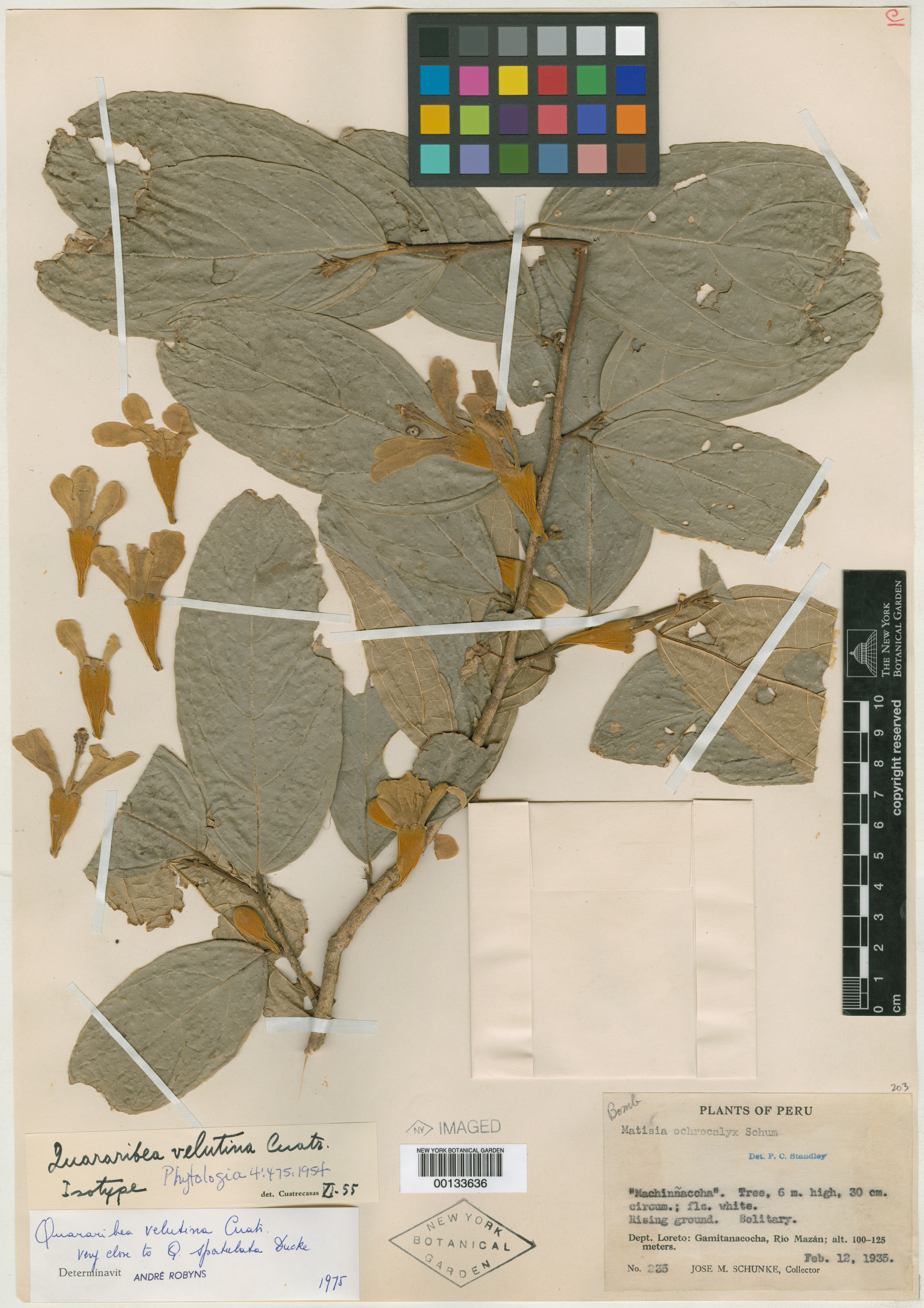

Conservation status
- Critically Endangered (IUCN 2.3)

Scientific classification
- Kingdom: Plantae
- Clade: Tracheophytes
- Clade: Angiosperms
- Clade: Eudicots
- Clade: Rosids
- Order: Malvales
- Family: Malvaceae
- Genus: Quararibea
- Species: Q. velutina

Binomial name
- Quararibea velutina Cuatrec.

= Quararibea velutina =

Species of plant

Quararibea velutina is a species of flowering plant in the family Malvaceae. It is found only in Peru.
