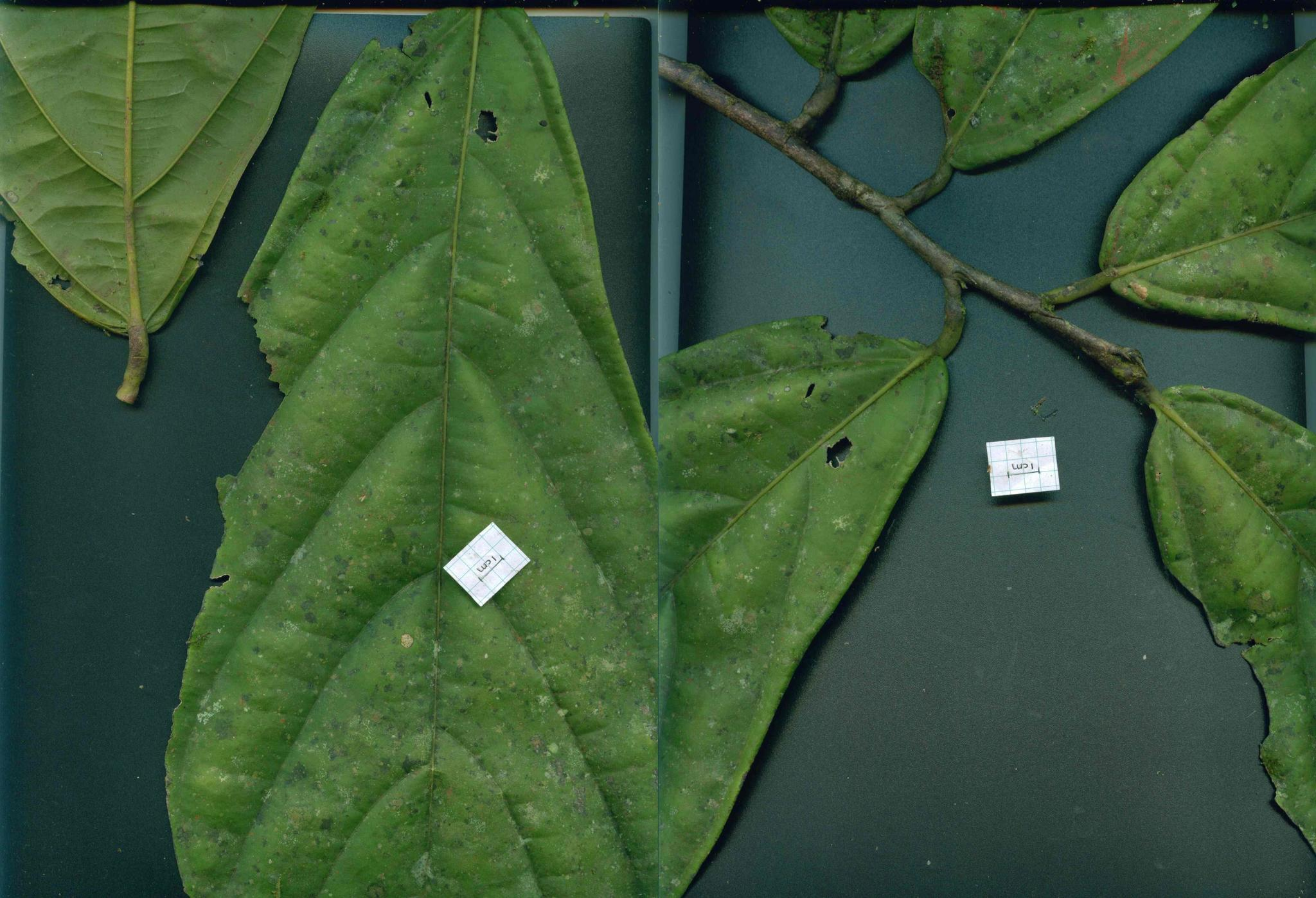

Conservation status
- Vulnerable (IUCN 3.1)

Scientific classification
- Kingdom: Plantae
- Clade: Tracheophytes
- Clade: Angiosperms
- Clade: Eudicots
- Clade: Rosids
- Order: Malvales
- Family: Malvaceae
- Genus: Quararibea
- Species: Q. platyphylla

Binomial name
- Quararibea platyphylla Pittier & Donn.Sm.

= Quararibea platyphylla =

Species of flowering plant

Quararibea platyphylla is a species of flowering plant in the family Malvaceae. It is a tree native to Costa Rica and Panama. It is a shrub to a small tree which grows 4 to 10 meters tall. It flowers in March, November and December and fruits in January. Flowers are visited by bees and other insects. It grows in lowland rainforest on the Caribbean coast of Panama and on the Caribbean and Pacific coasts of Costa Rica. It is threatened by habitat loss, and is considered rare in Costa Rica. The IUCN Red List assesses the species as Vulnerable.

The species was first described by Pittier & John Donnell Smith in 1897. Q. platyphylla is often confused with Q. costaricensis, a much more common species, inhabiting the same region.
