= Wild Palms (disambiguation) =

Wild Palms is a 1993 American television miniseries.

Wild Palms may refer also to:

- Wild Palms (band), a British alternative active from 2010 to 2017
- If I Forget Thee, Jerusalem, originally published as The Wild Palms, a 1939 novel by William Faulkner

== See also ==
- Arecaceae, the family of plants known as palms
- Quararibea pterocalyx, a South American plant known as wild palm
