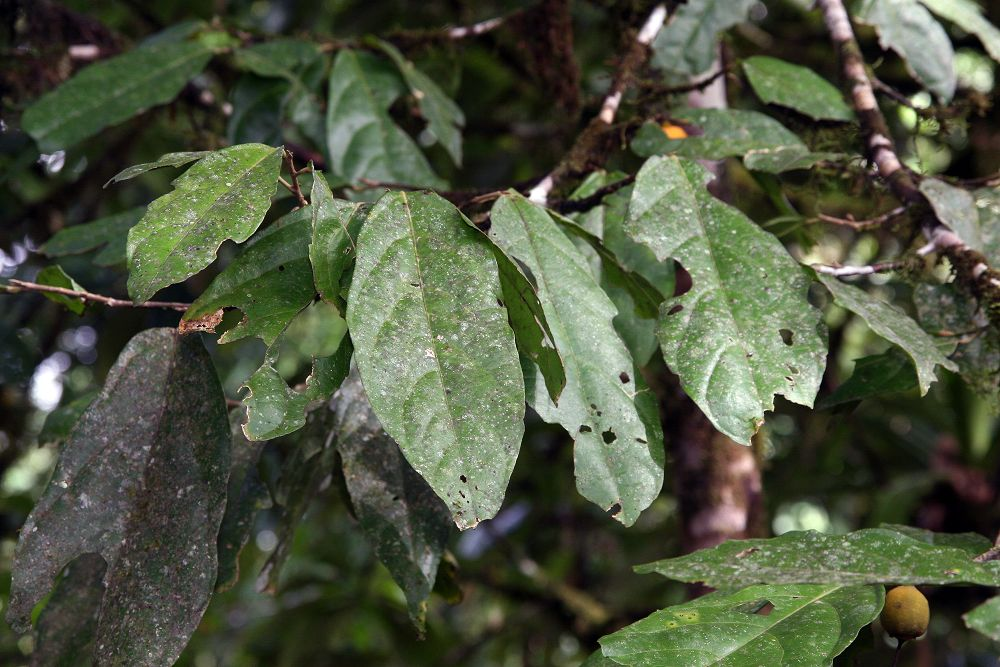

Conservation status
- Critically Endangered (IUCN 3.1)

Scientific classification
- Kingdom: Plantae
- Clade: Tracheophytes
- Clade: Angiosperms
- Clade: Eudicots
- Clade: Rosids
- Order: Malvales
- Family: Malvaceae
- Genus: Quararibea
- Species: Q. aurantiocalyx

Binomial name
- Quararibea aurantiocalyx W.S.Alverson

= Quararibea aurantiocalyx =

Species of flowering plant

Quararibea aurantiocalyx is a species of flowering plant in the family Malvaceae. It is a tree native to eastern Costa Rica and central Panama. It is a small to medium sized tree which grows 5 to 25 meters tall and flowers in March. It grows in humid submontane rain forest and cloud forest from 1,100 to 1,200 meters elevation. The species is rare and known from only two separated locations, and the IUCN Red List assesses the species as Critically Endangered.
