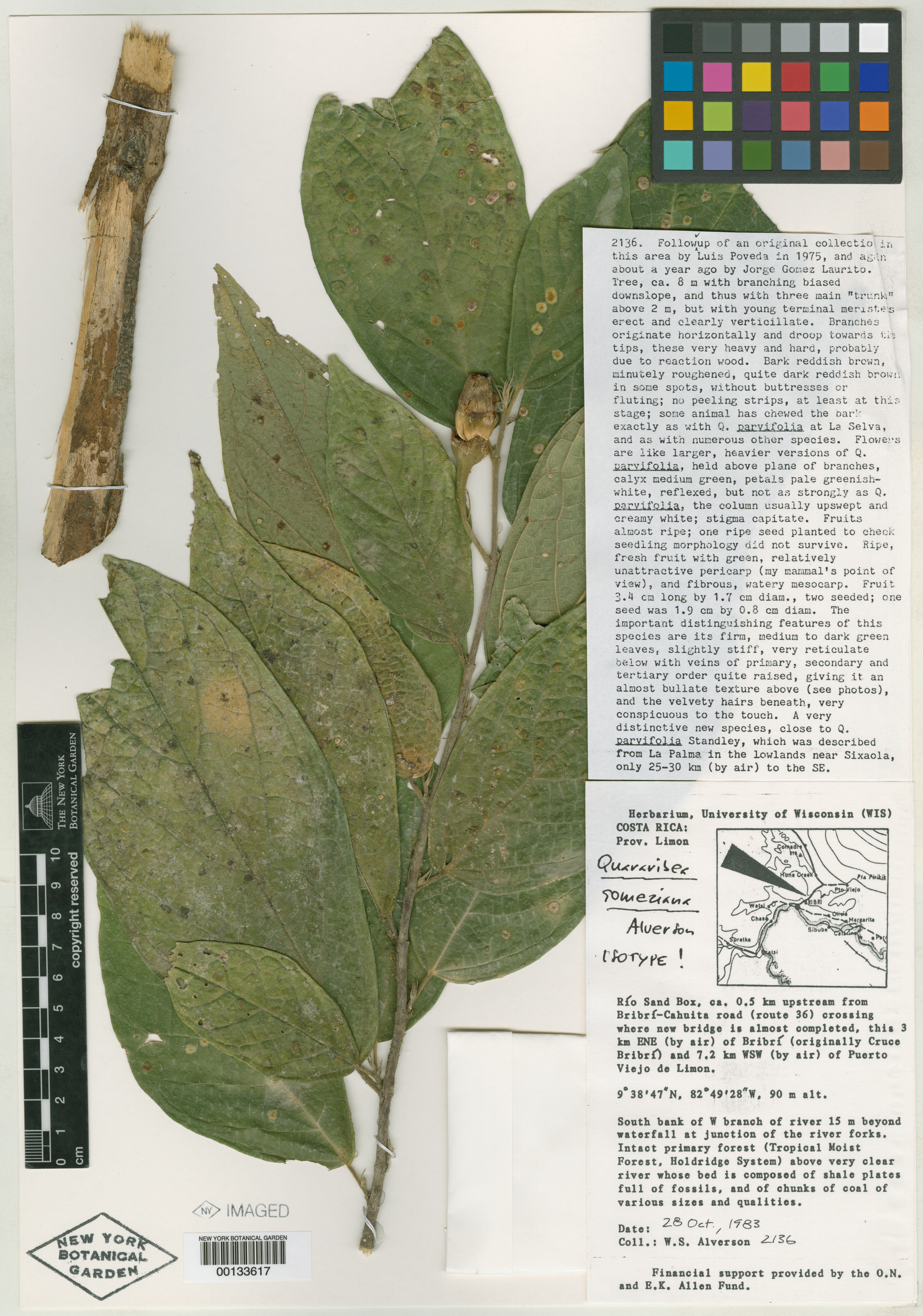

Conservation status
- Vulnerable (IUCN 3.1)

Scientific classification
- Kingdom: Plantae
- Clade: Tracheophytes
- Clade: Angiosperms
- Clade: Eudicots
- Clade: Rosids
- Order: Malvales
- Family: Malvaceae
- Genus: Quararibea
- Species: Q. gomeziana

Binomial name
- Quararibea gomeziana W.S.Alverson

= Quararibea gomeziana =

Species of flowering plant

Quararibea gomeziana is a species of flowering plant in the family Malvaceae. It is a tree native to eastern Costa Rica and western Panama. It is a large shrub or small tree, growing 5 to 12 meters tall. It flowers in January, March to May, and October, and fruits in February, May, and October. It grows in Atlantic lowland rain forest, mostly in Costa Rica, from 10 to 300 meters elevation. It is threatened by habitat loss, and the IUCN Red List assesses the species as Vulnerable.

The species was first described by William Surprison Alverson in 1989.
