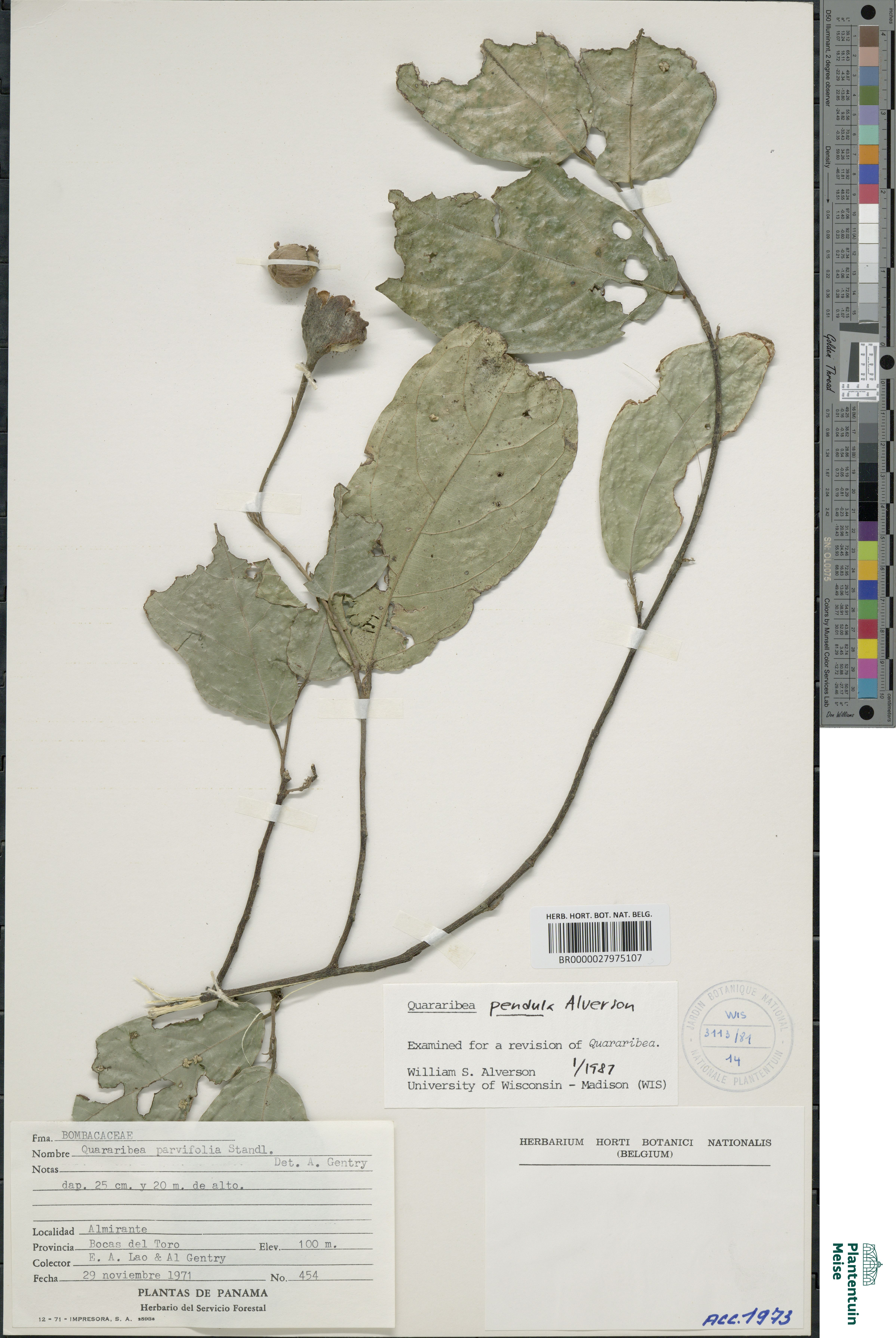

Conservation status
- Endangered (IUCN 3.1)

Scientific classification
- Kingdom: Plantae
- Clade: Tracheophytes
- Clade: Angiosperms
- Clade: Eudicots
- Clade: Rosids
- Order: Malvales
- Family: Malvaceae
- Genus: Quararibea
- Species: Q. pendula

Binomial name
- Quararibea pendula W.S.Alverson

= Quararibea pendula =

Species of flowering plant

Quararibea pendula is a species of flowering plant in the family Malvaceae. It is a tree native to eastern Costa Rica and western Panama. It is a shrub to small tree which grows 3 to 8 meters tall. It flowers in April, June, and October to December, and fruits in July. It is native to Atlantic lowland rain forest, where it grows in the forest understory or in riparian areas from 50 to 200 meters elevation. It is threatened by habitat loss, and the IUCN Red List assesses the species as endangered.

The species was first described by William Surprison Alverson in 1989.
