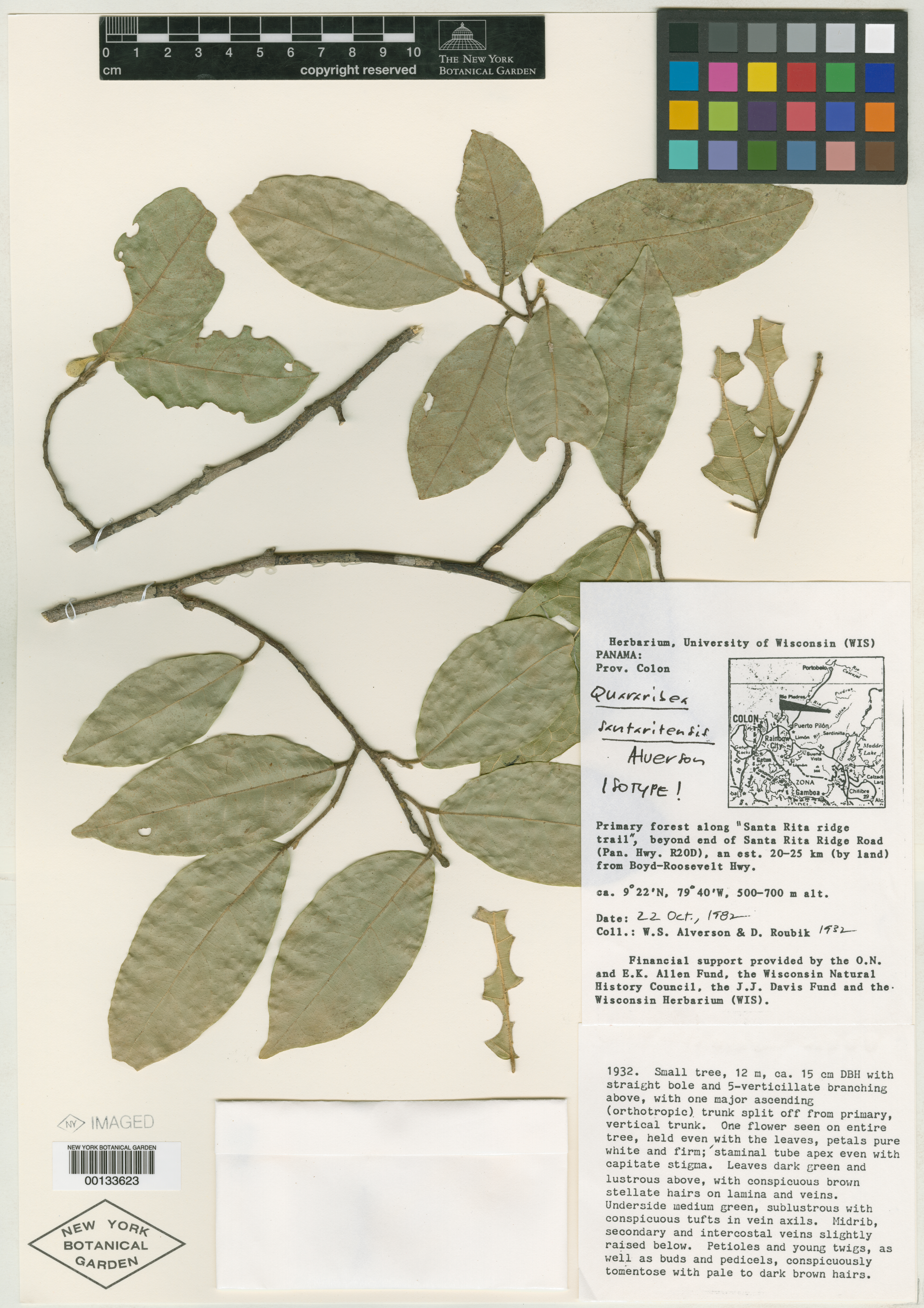

Conservation status
- Data Deficient (IUCN 3.1)

Scientific classification
- Kingdom: Plantae
- Clade: Tracheophytes
- Clade: Angiosperms
- Clade: Eudicots
- Clade: Rosids
- Order: Malvales
- Family: Malvaceae
- Genus: Quararibea
- Species: Q. santaritensis

Binomial name
- Quararibea santaritensis Alverson

= Quararibea santaritensis =

Species of flowering plant

Quararibea santaritensis is a species of flowering plant in the family Malvaceae. It is found only in Panama.
