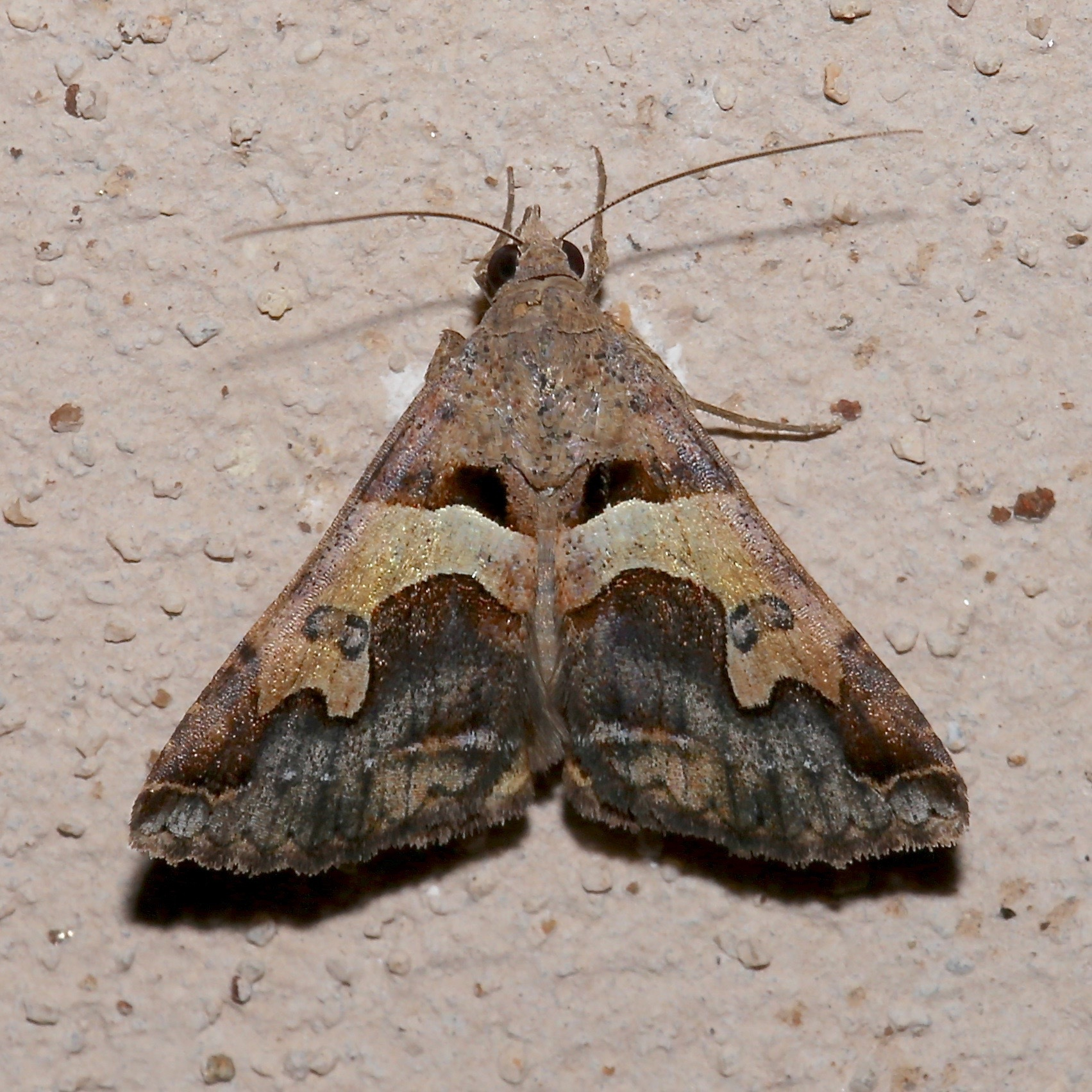

Scientific classification
- Kingdom: Animalia
- Phylum: Arthropoda
- Class: Insecta
- Order: Lepidoptera
- Superfamily: Noctuoidea
- Family: Erebidae
- Tribe: Melipotini
- Genus: Panula
- Species: P. inconstans

Binomial name
- Panula inconstans Guenée, 1852

= Panula inconstans =

Species of moth

Panula inconstans is a species of moth in the family Erebidae. It is found in North America.
