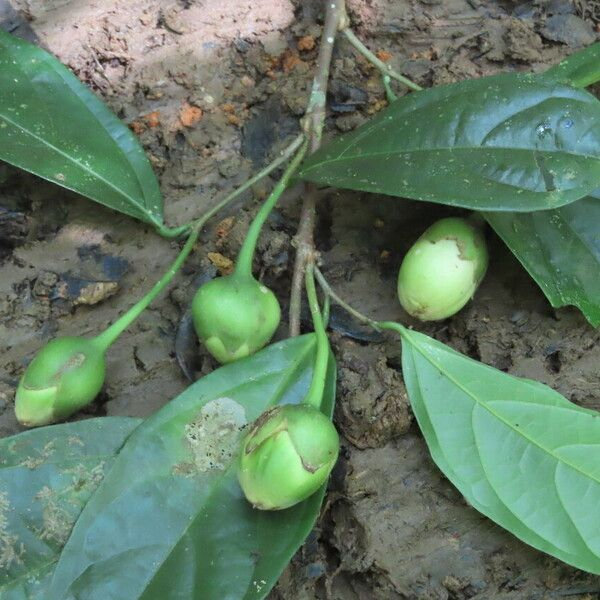

Conservation status
- Least Concern (IUCN 3.1)

Scientific classification
- Kingdom: Plantae
- Clade: Tracheophytes
- Clade: Angiosperms
- Clade: Eudicots
- Clade: Rosids
- Order: Malvales
- Family: Malvaceae
- Genus: Quararibea
- Species: Q. yunckeri

Binomial name
- Quararibea yunckeri Standl.

= Quararibea yunckeri =

Species of flowering plant

Quararibea yunckeri is a species of flowering plant in the family Malvaceae. It is found only in Honduras.
