= Quararibea grandifolia =

Conservation status
- Endangered (IUCN 3.1)

Scientific classification
- Kingdom: Plantae
- Clade: Tracheophytes
- Clade: Angiosperms
- Clade: Eudicots
- Clade: Rosids
- Order: Malvales
- Family: Malvaceae
- Genus: Quararibea
- Species: Q. grandifolia

Binomial name
- Quararibea grandifolia (Little) Cuatrec.

Synonyms
- Matisia grandifolia Little

Species of flowering plant

Quararibea grandifolia, the molinillo, is a species of flowering plant in the family Malvaceae sensu lato or Bombacaceae. It is a tree native to western Colombia and Ecuador. Its natural habitats are subtropical or tropical moist lowland forests and subtropical or tropical moist montane forests. It is threatened by habitat loss.
