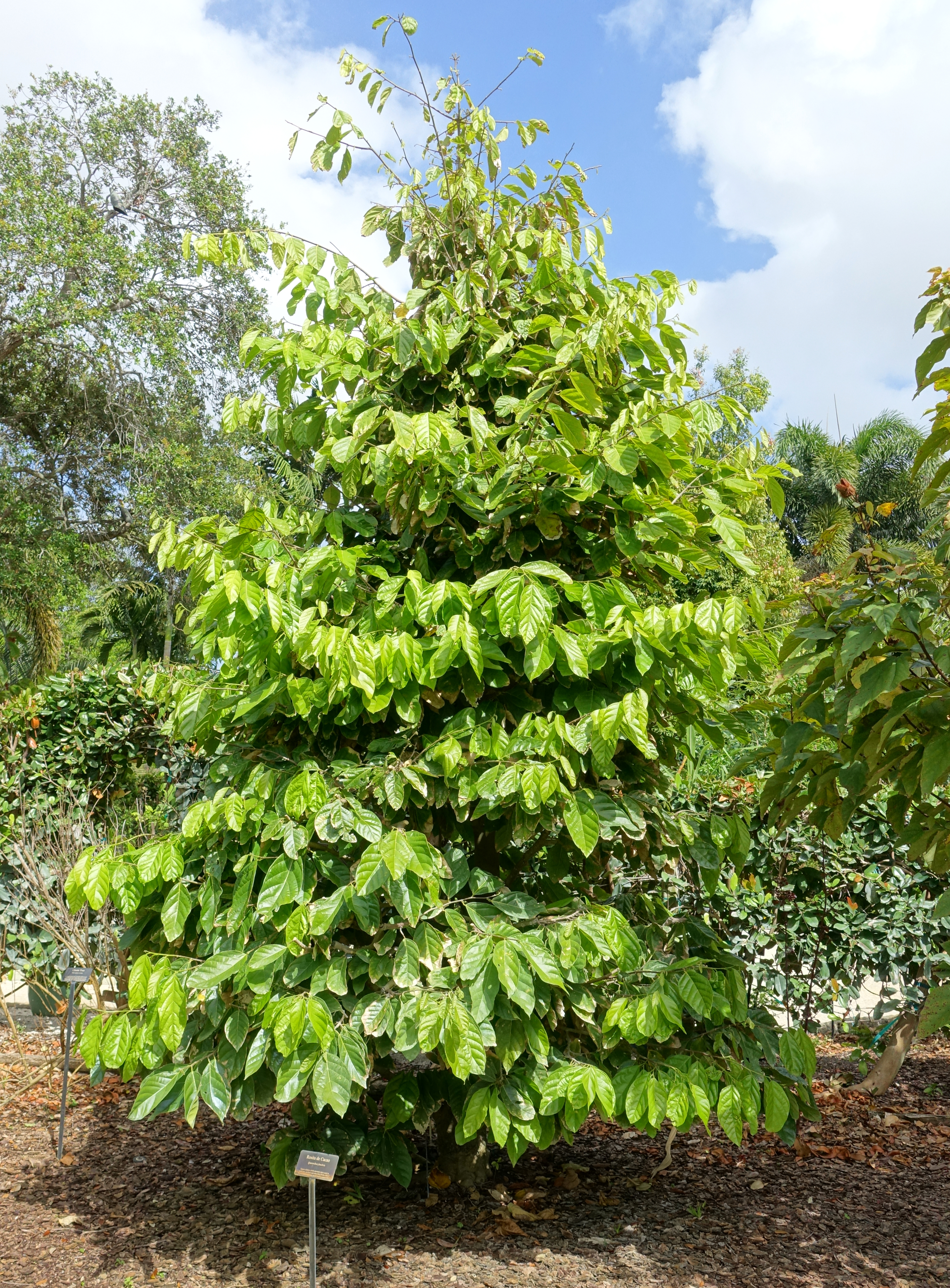

Scientific classification
- Kingdom: Plantae
- Clade: Tracheophytes
- Clade: Angiosperms
- Clade: Eudicots
- Clade: Rosids
- Order: Malvales
- Family: Malvaceae
- Genus: Quararibea
- Species: Q. funebris

Binomial name
- Quararibea funebris (La Llave) Vischer

Synonyms
- Synonymy: Lexarza funebris La Llave; Myrodia funebris (La Llave) Benth.

= Quararibea funebris =

Species of tree

Quararibea funebris has common names including huyu (Maya), flor de cacao, madre de cacao, coco mama, swizzle stick tree, cacahuaxochitl or cacaoxochitl, (Nahuatl = chocolate flower) rosa de cacao, rosita de cacao, tepecacao, funeral tree, flor de tejate and tejate. It is a tree native to Belize, Costa Rica, El Salvador, Guatemala, Honduras, Mexico and Nicaragua.

This plant is used as a medicinal plant, and the flowers as one of the essential ingredients in the traditional chocolate-maize drink known as tejate. The twigs also have some of the distinctive flavour and are used for mixing and frothing tejate while preparing it. Quararibea fieldii and Quararibea guatemalteca flowers and twigs were reported as used in the same manner but these species are now regarded as synonyms of Q. funebris subsp. funebris. There are two recognised subspecies: Q. funebris subsp. funebris and Q. funebris subsp. nicaraguensis The flowers of plants of this genus are also depicted on Maya drinking vessels used for cacao.

The first report by Europeans was in the 16th century by Bernardino de Sahagún who provided an illustration of the flowers being harvested by Aztecs and reported: "There are also other trees called cacauaxochitl which bear flowers which are called cacauaxochitl. They are like jasmine and have a very delicate but pungent fragrance."

As well as adding flavour, the flowers are mucilaginous and thicken the drinks made from it. Schultes reported that all species of Quararibea have the distinctive odour and the smell remains strong even on herbarium specimens more than a century old.

The epithet funebris meaning "of funerals, funereal" comes from the observations reported by Pablo de La Llave, who published the first botanical description of the plant. In Izucar, funerals were held under the lowest branches of their one large tree. The flowers were taken from the tree to flavour a cold cocoa drink called pozonqui, drunk at weddings and festivals.
