= Panula (moth) =

Scientific classification
- Kingdom: Animalia
- Phylum: Arthropoda
- Class: Insecta
- Order: Lepidoptera
- Superfamily: Noctuoidea
- Family: Erebidae
- Tribe: Melipotini
- Genus: Panula; Guenée in Boisduval & Guenée, 1852

Genus of moths

Panula is a genus of moths in the family Erebidae. The genus was erected by Achille Guenée in 1852.

== Species ==
- Panula inconstans Guenée, 1852
- Panula sororcula Draudt & Gaede, 1944
