= Tejate =

Maize and cacao beverage from Oaxaca

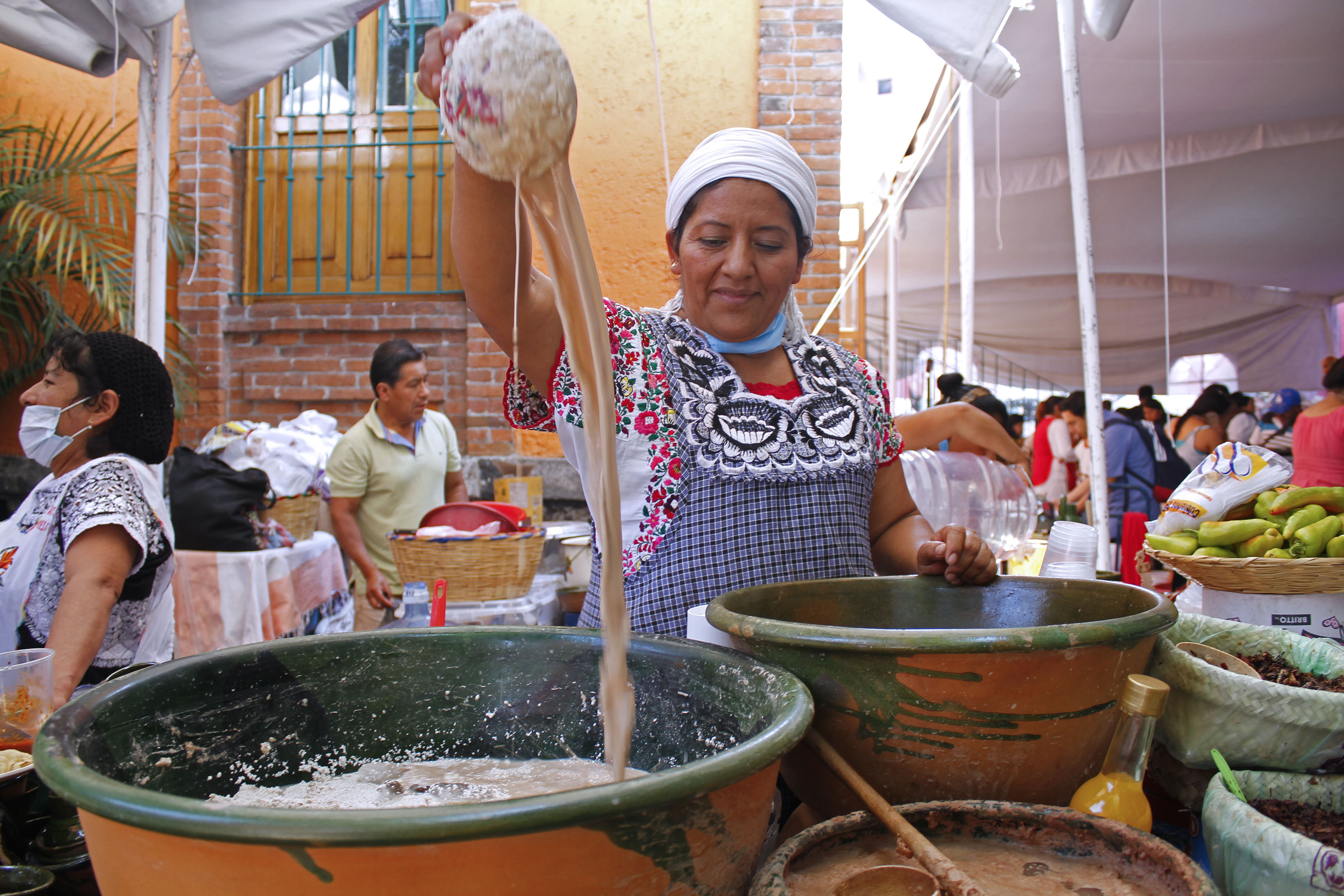
Vendor mixing the beverage before serving it

Tejate [teˈxate] is a non-alcoholic maize and cacao beverage traditionally made in Oaxaca, Mexico, originating from pre-Hispanic times. It remains very popular among the indigenous Mixtec and Zapotec peoples, especially in rural areas. It is also very popular in Oaxaca and the surrounding regions. Principal ingredients include toasted maize, fermented cacao beans, toasted mamey pits (pixtle) and flor de cacao (also known as rosita de cacao). These are finely ground into a paste. The paste is mixed with water, usually by hand, and when it is ready, the flor de cacao rises to the top to form a pasty foam. It can be served as-is or with some sugar syrup to sweeten it. The drink is served cold.

The origin of the Mexican Spanish name tejate is not known for certain, but is thought to derive from the Nahuatl "floury water" texātl [ˈteʃat͡ɬ], compounded from "flour" textli [ˈteʃt͡ɬi] and "water" ātl [aːt͡ɬ]. The Zapotec name for tejate is cu'uhb.

== Ingredients and preparation ==
The main ingredients of tejate are roasted corn flour, fermented cocoa beans, mamey seeds and cocoa flower also known as rosita de cacao, which grows only in San Andrés Huayapam. These ingredients are finely ground into a paste, which is then mixed with cold water, usually by hand, and when ready, the cocoa butter rises to the top of the container to form a pasty froth. The drink is served cold and can be served as is or with a little sugar syrup to sweeten it.

== See also ==
- Champurrado
- Tascalate
- List of maize dishes
