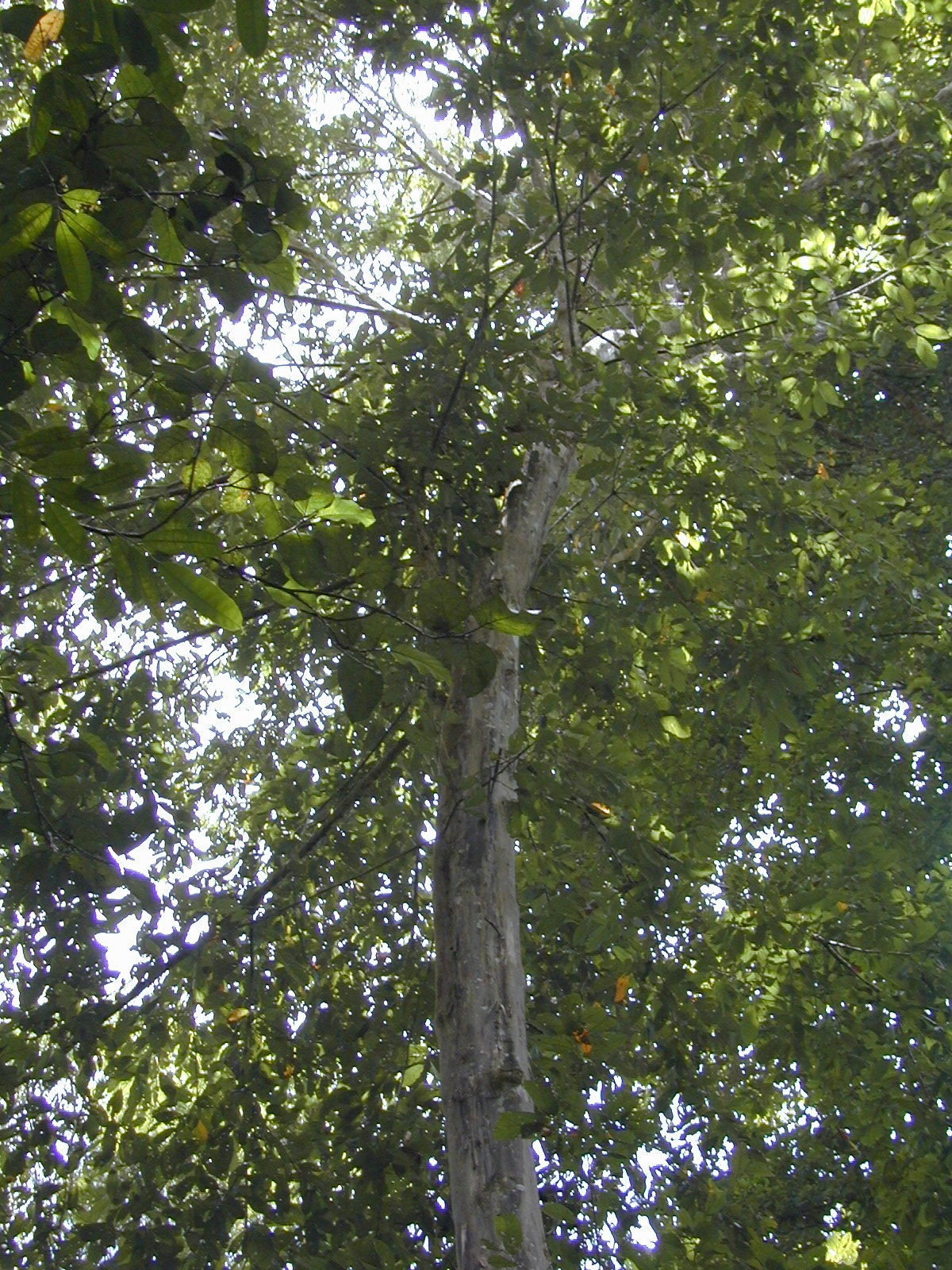

Scientific classification
- Kingdom: Plantae
- Clade: Tracheophytes
- Clade: Angiosperms
- Clade: Eudicots
- Clade: Rosids
- Order: Malvales
- Family: Malvaceae
- Genus: Quararibea
- Species: Q. asterolepis

Binomial name
- Quararibea asterolepis Pittier

= Quararibea asterolepis =

Species of tree

Quararibea asterolepis (cinco dedos, guácimo molenillo, guayabillo, garrocho, molenillo, panula, palo cuadrado; syn. Quararibea stenophylla Pittier) is a timber tree native to Brazil, Colombia, Costa Rica, Ecuador, Panama, Peru, and Venezuela. This plant can be used for cellulose production.
