= Quararibea pterocalyx =

Conservation status
- Least Concern (IUCN 3.1)

Scientific classification
- Kingdom: Plantae
- Clade: Tracheophytes
- Clade: Angiosperms
- Clade: Eudicots
- Clade: Rosids
- Order: Malvales
- Family: Malvaceae
- Genus: Quararibea
- Species: Q. pterocalyx

Binomial name
- Quararibea pterocalyx Hemsl.

Species of flowering plant

Quararibea pterocalyx, the wild palm or cinco dedos, is a species of flowering plant in the family Malvaceae. It is found in Colombia, Costa Rica, Panama, and Venezuela. It is threatened by habitat loss.
