= Chocolatiere =

Chocolate pots

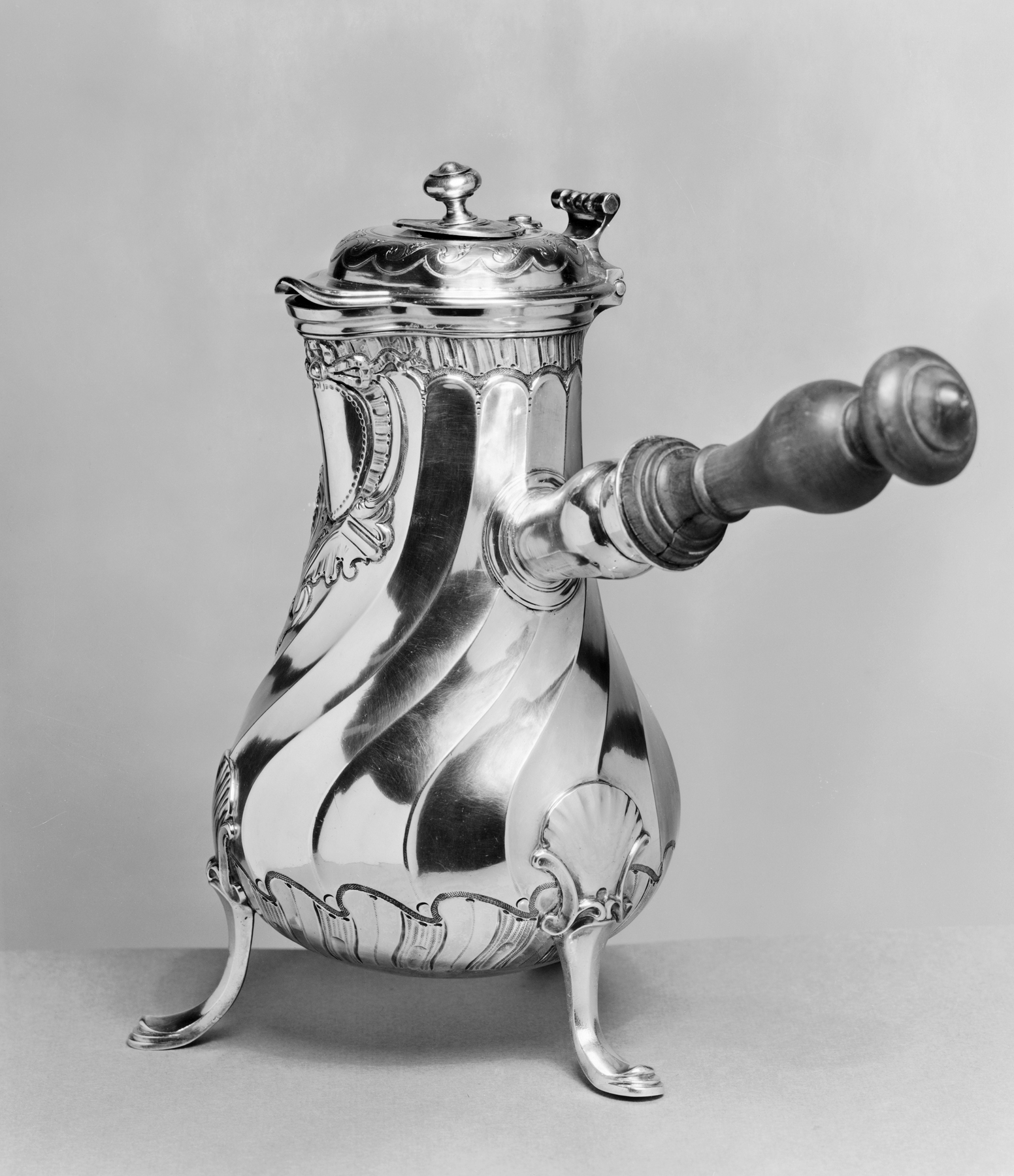
A chocolatiere made in Paris in 1774

Chocolatieres or chocolatières (French pronunciation: [ʃɔkɔlatjɛʁ]) are chocolate pots used to prepare drinking chocolate, emerging in the 17th century. Made from precious metals and porcelain, they resembled a coffee pot with a hole in the top where a molinillo or swizzle stick (molinet) could be inserted and used to froth the drink. Once prepared, chocolate beverages were poured into drinking vessels and served.

== History ==
Chocolatieres represented a modification of earlier chocolate-making equipment. In 16th-century Mesoamerican society, chocolate was made by pouring liquid between cups from a height, generating a large head of foam. As the Spanish entered the Americas and encountered chocolate, they developed the molinillo, a device that could be twirled between the hands, foaming chocolate in large containers made of pottery and likely wood. Over time, wooden lids were added to prevent sloshing and assist with foam development, with a hole in the centre to allow the molinillo in. In The True History of Chocolate, historians Michael D. Coe and Sophie Coe speculate copper versions of these devices preceded the French chocolatiere in Italy and Spain.

The Coes report the French are "usually credited" with the development of the chocolatiere. Though the earliest evidence they identify comes from 1685 by an English silversmith, they concur with a French origin, arguing descriptions of a gift of chocolatieres to the French from the 1686 Siamese embassy to France, including one made entirely of gold, meant chocolatieres must have been established in France much earlier. In the French etymological dictionary Trésor de la langue française, the earliest identified use of the term is dated to 1671 in the letters of Madame de Sévigné, writing to her daughter "But you are not well. You have not slept at all. Chocolate would restore you, but you do not own a chocolate pot [chocolatière]—I've thought about that time and again. How will you manage?" (Note: Mais vous ne vous portez point bien, vous n'avez point dormi? Le chocolat vous remettra mais vous n'avez pas de chocolatière; j'y ai pensé mille fois; comment ferez-vous?)

The device soon became dominant in Europe for making chocolate. In the middle of the 18th century, the chocolatiere was commonly featured in family portraits, intended to represent an ideal maintained among the aristocracy of social situations marked by temperance as an alternative to alcohol. The first records of appearances in the Thirteen Colonies arrive in 1690 in New York, where a silver chocolate pot is noted as a "jocolato pot". Such pots were rare, expensive and considered highly fashionable in the Colonies. The use of chocolatieres declined in the 19th century, as the invention of techniques separating cocoa butter from chocolate and therefore chocolate powder eliminated the need for devices that could beat heavy chocolate drinks. In the 20th century, chocolatieres became valued for their appearance and history, and were collected.

== Mechanism ==
In the chocolatiere, earlier devices were modified. 90° around the side of the pot from the spout, a wooden handle was fixed. The lid became opened via a hinge, and the hole covered by a finial that could be unscrewed or unhinged. The new devices were made from porcelain or, among nobility, silver or gold. Chocolate beverages could be made in the devices by placing a compressed brick or cake of chocolate inside with hot water and foaming with a molinillo (known as moussoir in French) inserted through the hole in the top. The hot, foamy chocolate drink could then be served into drinking vessels.

Several of these features were shared with coffee pots of the era, including the handle and lack of internal filtration. The primary aspect that distinguished the two, then, was the hole for a stirring rod.

== Gallery ==
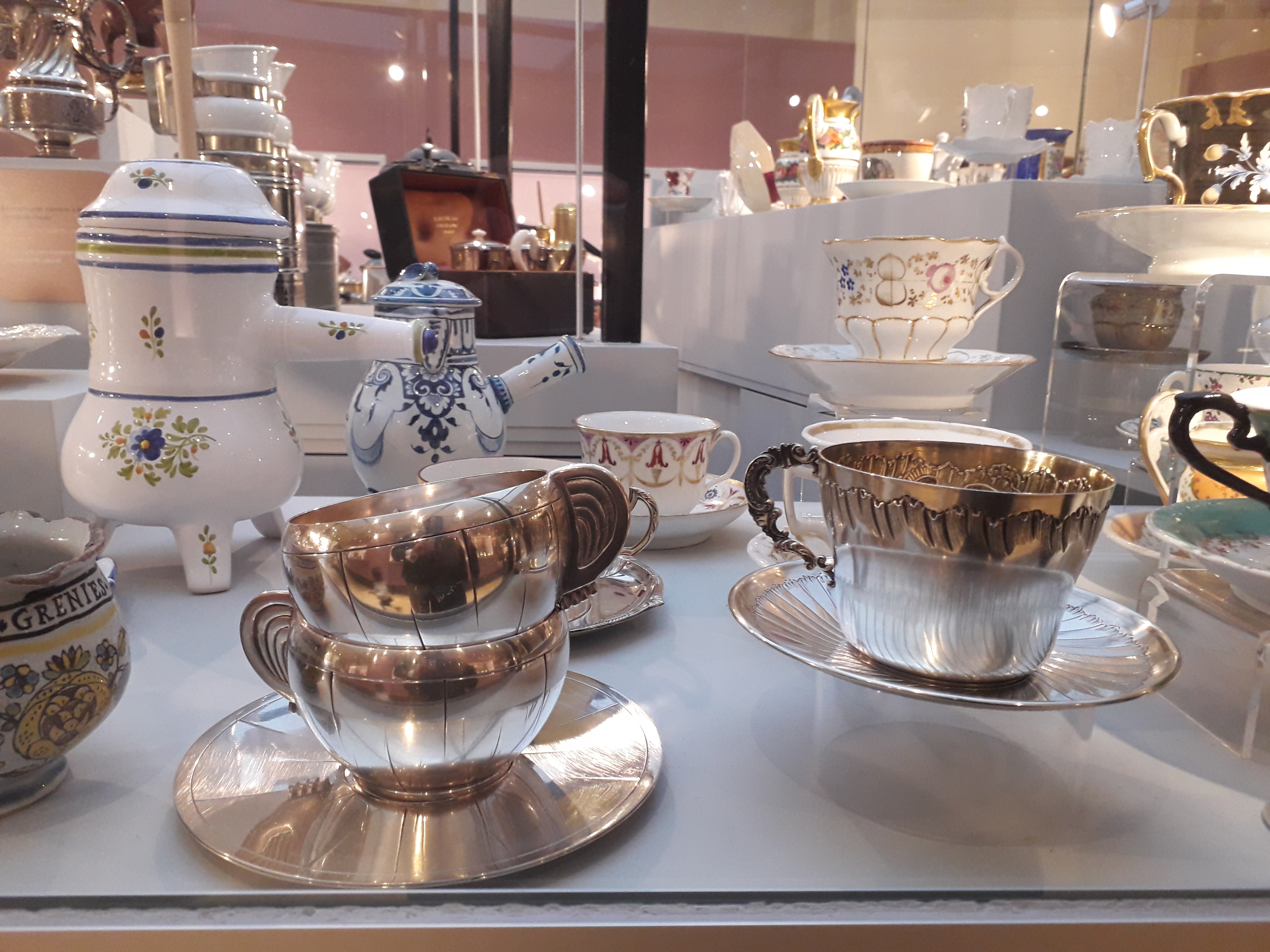
French chocolatières and chocolate cups from the 18th and 19th centuries

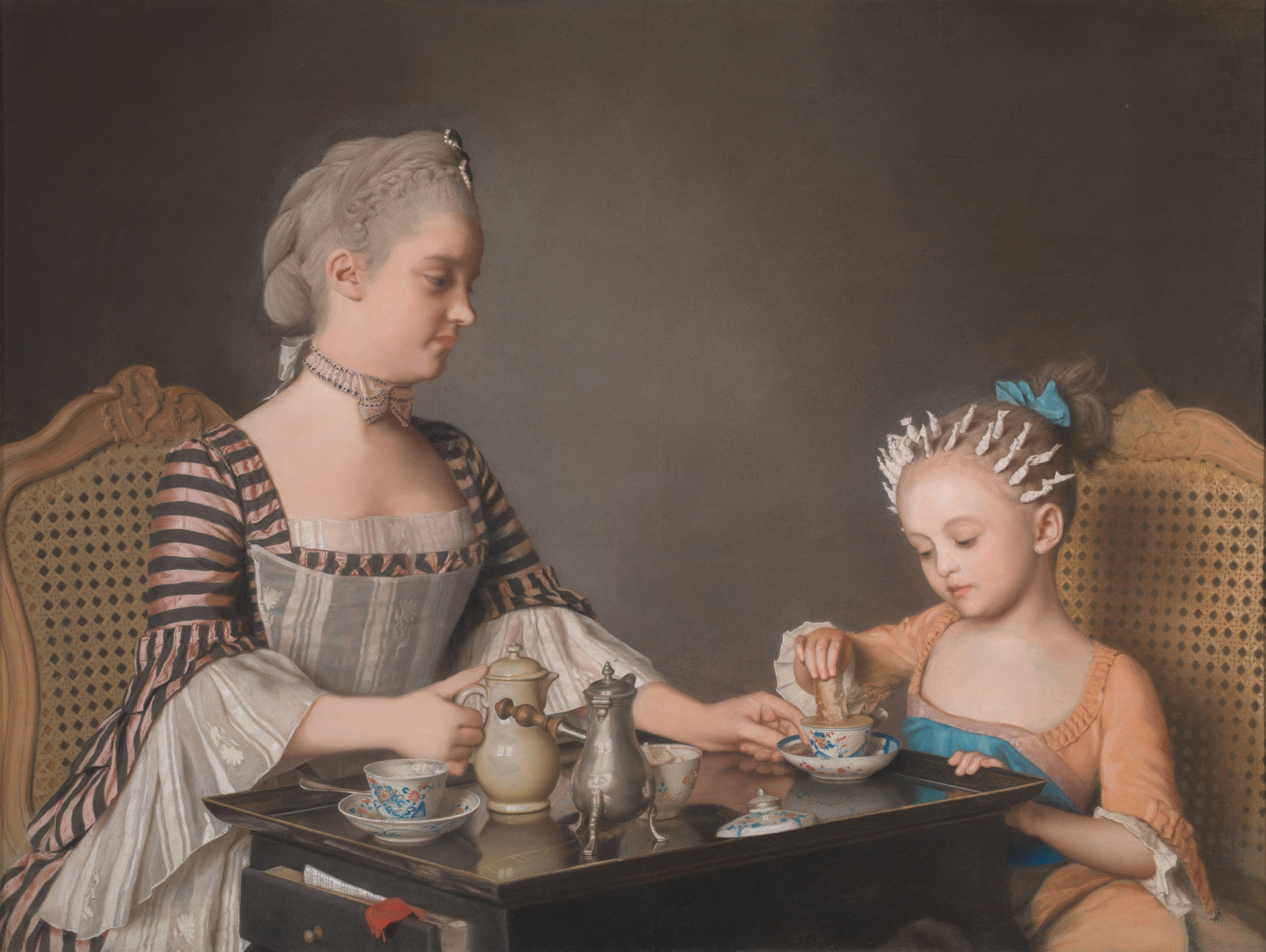
The Lavergne Family Breakfast by Jean-Étienne Liotard, 1754

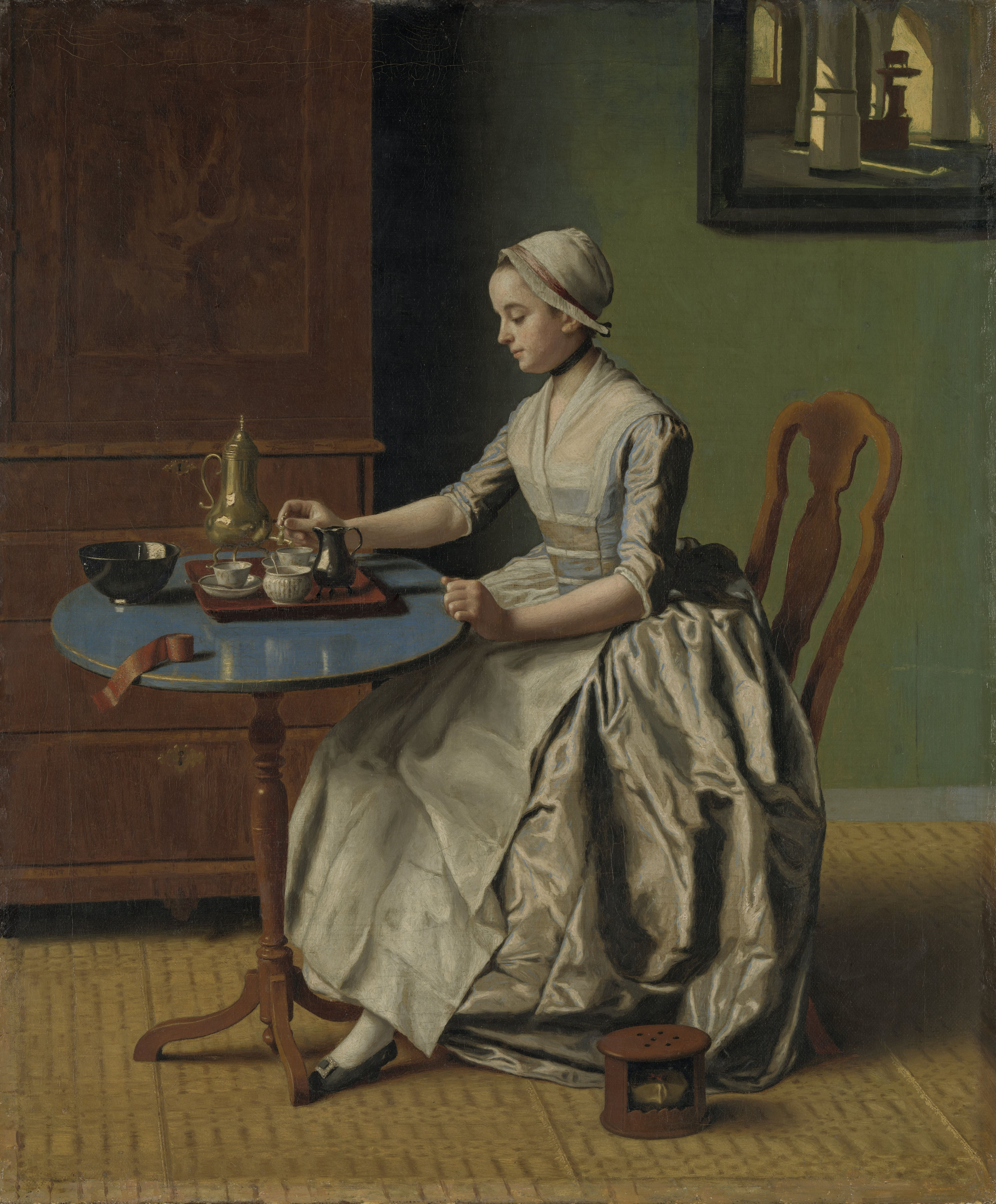
Dutch Girl at Breakfast by Jean-Étienne Liotard, circa 1756

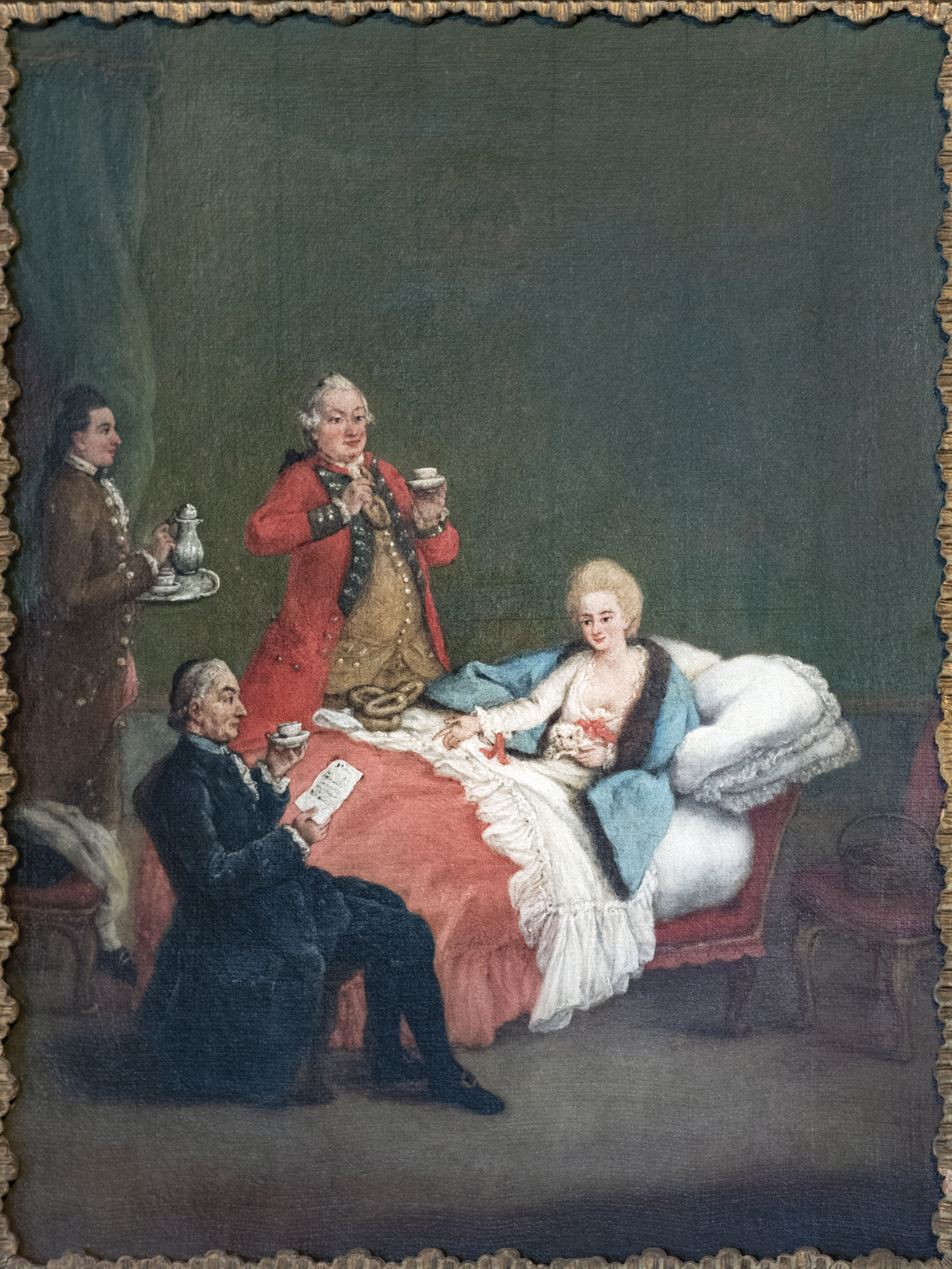
La cioccolata del mattino (The Morning Chocolate) by Pietro Longhi, circa 1775

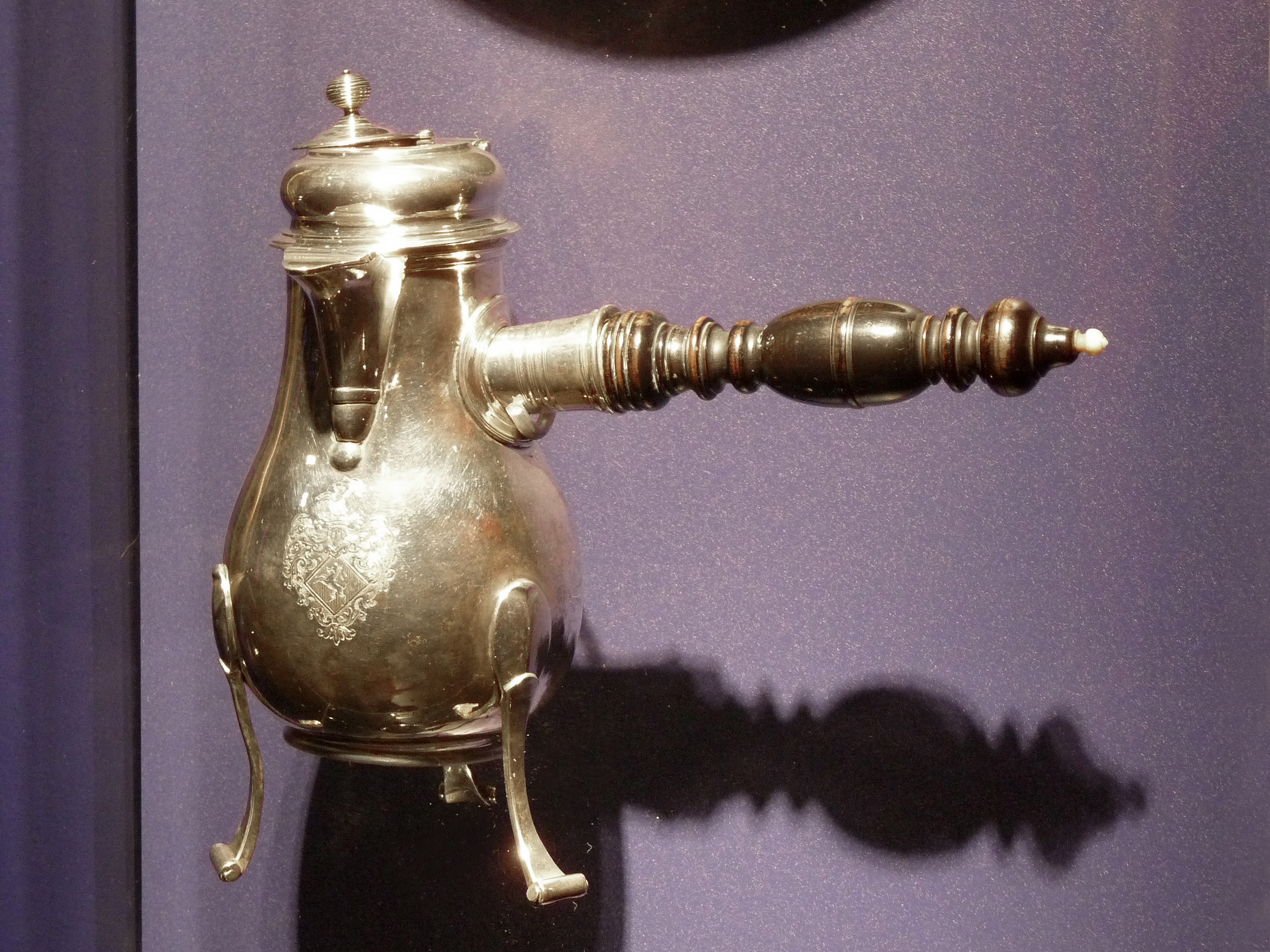
An 18th-century chocolatière from Strasbourg, France

== See also ==
- Coco chocolatero
- History of chocolate
- Trembleuse

== Sources ==
- Coe, Sophie D.; Coe, Michael D. (1996). The True History of Chocolate (1st ed.). New York: Thames & Hudson. ISBN 0-500-01693-3.
- Gray, Annie (2010). "Chocolatada! Sensing the Past: Recreating a 17th-Century Chocolate Recipe". In Symonds, James (ed.). Table Settings: The Material Culture and Social Context of Dining AD 1700–1900. Oxford: Oxbow Books. ISBN 978-1-84217-298-8.
- Jones, Christine A (2013). Shapely Bodies: The Image of Porcelain in Eighteenth-Century France. Newark, Delaware: University of Delaware Press. ISBN 978-1-61149-408-2.
- Linford, Jenny (2018). The Seven Culinary Wonders of the World: A History of Honey, Salt, Chile, Pork, Rice, Cacao, and Tomato. London: Quarto Publishing. ISBN 978-0-71124-022-3.
- Moss, Sarah; Badenoch, Alexander (2009). Chocolate: A Global History. London: Reaktion Books. ISBN 978-1-86189-524-0.
- Poelmans, Eline; Swinnen, Johan (2016). "A Brief Economic History of Chocolate". In Squicciarini, Mara P; Swinnen, Johan (eds.). The Economics of Chocolate. Oxford University Press. ISBN 978-0-19-179326-4.
- Shapiro, Howard-Yana; Grivetti, Louis E, eds. (2009). Chocolate: History, Culture, and Heritage. Hoboken, New Jersey: John Wiley & Sons. ISBN 978-0-470-12165-8.
  - Lange, Amanda. "Chocolate Preparation and Serving Vessels in Early North America". In Shapiro & Grivetti (2009).
  - Perkins, Suzanne. "Is It a Chocolate Pot? Chocolate and Its Accoutrements in France from Cookbook to Collectible". In Shapiro & Grivetti (2009).
