= Chocolate pot =

Cooking appliance

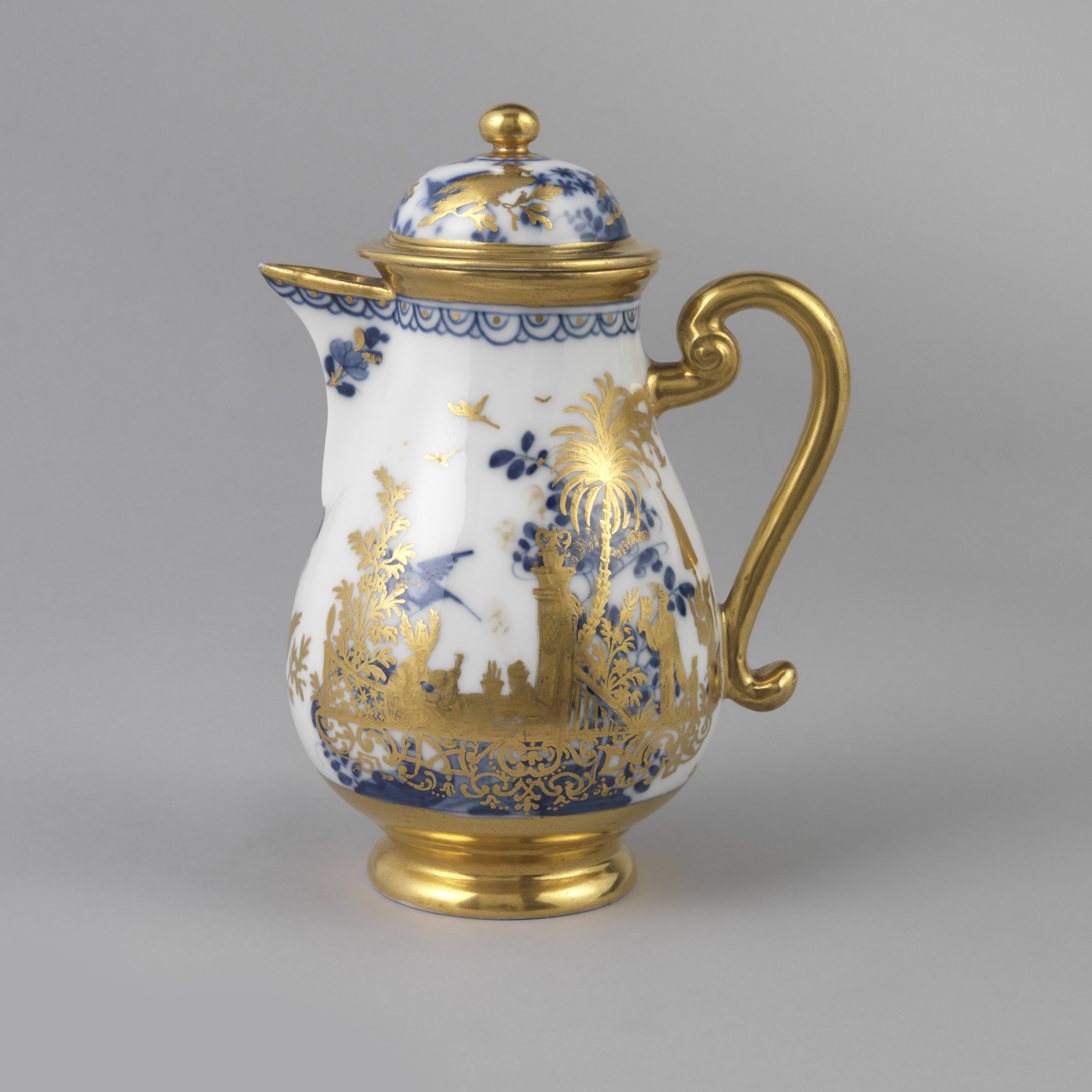
A German lidded chocolate pot, circa 1740

The chocolate pot is a device used for preparing and serving chocolate or cacao beverages. Some in the Americas have also been used as drinking vessels.

== Maya ==
Cacao beverages have been consumed since at least 1000 BCE in Central America, although due to the limits of research methods, drinks made by fermenting the pulp around cocoa beans cannot be distinguished from chocolate drinks. Some scholars make further distinctions between "chocolate", drinks made from roasted and dried cocoa beans, and other cacao beverages.

=== Cylindrical vases ===
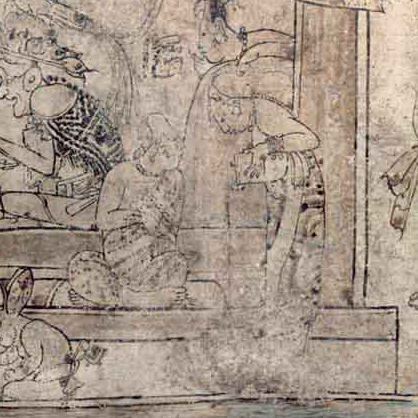
Detail of liquid being poured on the Princeton Vase

Cylindrical vessels, inscribed with hieroglyphs indicating use and ownership were used throughout the Classic period (250–900 CE). Of these vessels, those inscribed with glyphs that are generally translated as "Someone’s drinking vessel for cacao" have been labelled "chocolate pots" or "chocolate vases". The most well-known of the Mayan chocolate vases, the Princeton Vase, includes a scene on its side of a liquid being poured between cylindrical vessels. A similar act is described by Gonzalo Fernandez de Oviedo in the 16th century:

...having dissolved [a prepared chocolate mass and water mixture] in a calabash or cup, they take another, or the vessel from which they wish to drink it, and put it empty on the ground, and holding in their hands the calabash in which the cacao is dissolved they let it fall in a stream from a height of two 'palmas' more or less, into the empty vessel from which they are going to drink, which raises a high foam above it, and thus they drink it... (Note: Para beberlo echan á la cantidad de treynta almendras molidas un quartillo de agua, é deslíenlo en ella con la mano, trayéndolo al rededor, como puchecilla; é desfecho en aquella agua en una higüera ó taça, toman otra ó el vaso en que lo quieren beber é pónenle vaçio en tierra, é teniendo en las manos la higüera, en que está desleido el cacao, échanlo á chorro desde dos palmos de alto, ó poco mas ó menos, en el vaso que estaba vaçio en que lo han de beber: é levanta una espuma alta por çima, é assi lo beben)

No traces of theobromine, an active ingredient unique to cacao in Mesoamerica, have been identified in pottery remnants of these vessels. One theory has these vases as intended to carry dried cocoa beans.

=== Spouted vessels ===
Spouted vessels were used in the area spanning Mesoamerica through South America from the early Middle Preclassic Period (1000–600 BCE). (Note: As of 2002, no evidence of spouted vessels had been found from before 800 BCE.) Since at least the early 20th century, these spouted vessels have been identified by archeologists as "chocolate pots", perhaps due to the resemblance of late forms to European chocolate and tea pots, and despite a lack of evidence for such use in highland areas and the Yucatán Peninsula. (Note: In some modern Maya communities, spouted vessels are used as water containers.) In some areas, evidence has been identified, for instance at the Maya archeological site of Colha, Belize. There, large traces of theobromine have been found in some pottery from the Middle and Late Preclassic Period.

=== Other ===
Traces of cacao have been found in a jar found at Río Azul topped with a screw cap, a glyph representing cacao on a lidded vessel, and vase on a pedestel, which resembles chocolate pots later used by the Aztecs.

== Aztecs ==
Among the Aztecs, vases mounted on pedestals were used for making chocolate, using the same technique of producing foam that was depicted on the Princeton Vase.

== After European contact ==
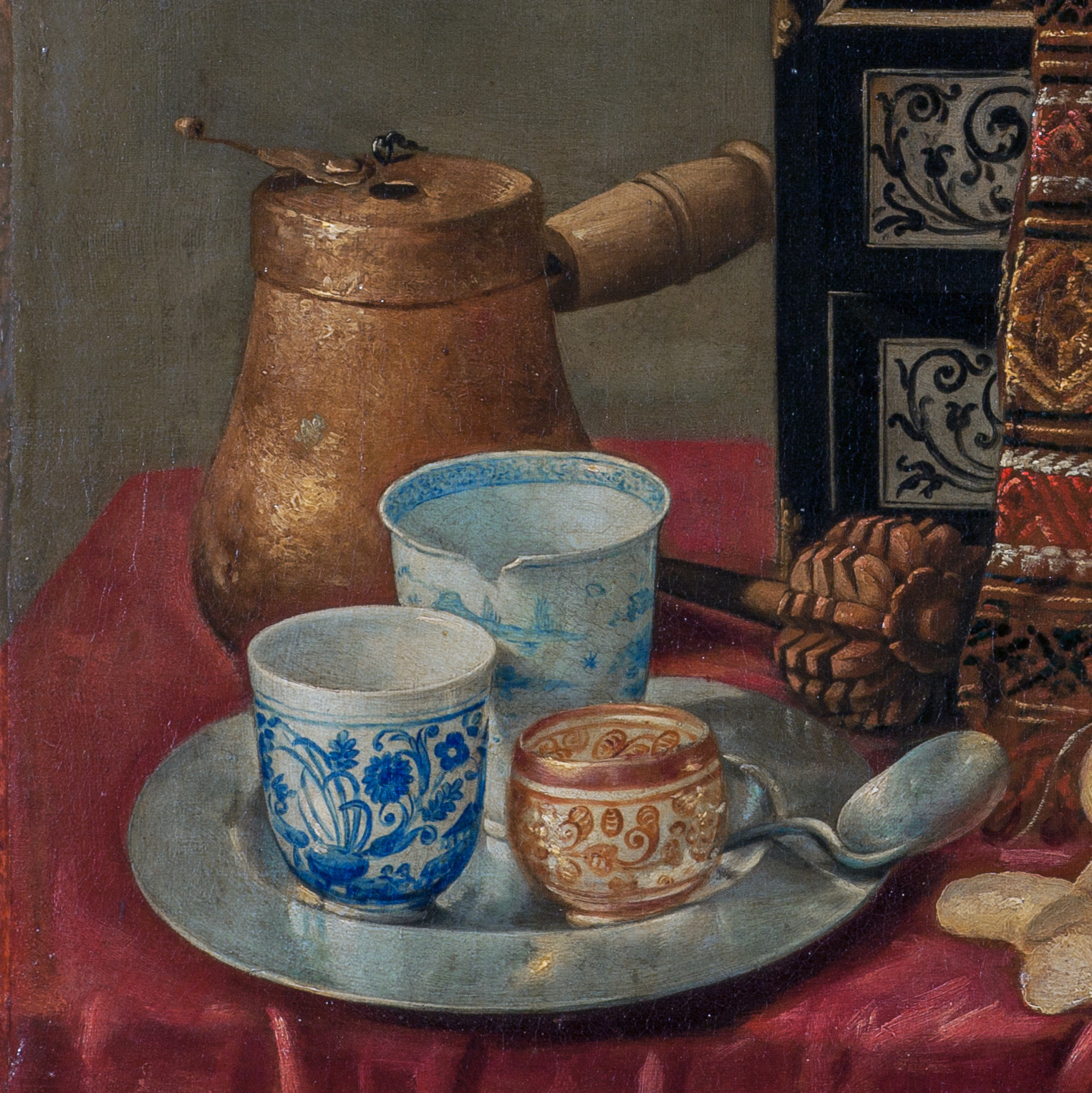
Detail from a still life painted in Spain by Antonio de Pereda in 1652. A chocolatera and molinillo are visible, alongside porcelain serving cups.

As the Spaniards encountered the Americas and chocolate, the technique of pouring chocolate between vessels to raise a foam was abandoned. In their place, devices called molinillo were created that could be twirled between the hands to beat chocolate within one, large container made pottery and likely wood. By the end of the 16th century the use of the new implements had become widespread. Chocolate making using the method of pouring chocolate between vessels was still being undertaken as of the early 17th century in the Americas, as described by the priest Thomas Gage. Sophie Coe interprets Gage's comments as describing a ritual practice, and speculates the end of the practice may have come with the eradication of non-Christian practices by the Spanish.

Over time, wooden lids were added to prevent sloshing and assist with foam development, with a hole in the centre to allow the molinillo in. As of the mid-16th century, the Spanish word for their chocolate pots was chocolatera. In The True History of Chocolate, historians Michael D. Coe and Sophie Coe speculate copper versions of these devices had arisen in Italy and Spain by the late 17th century.

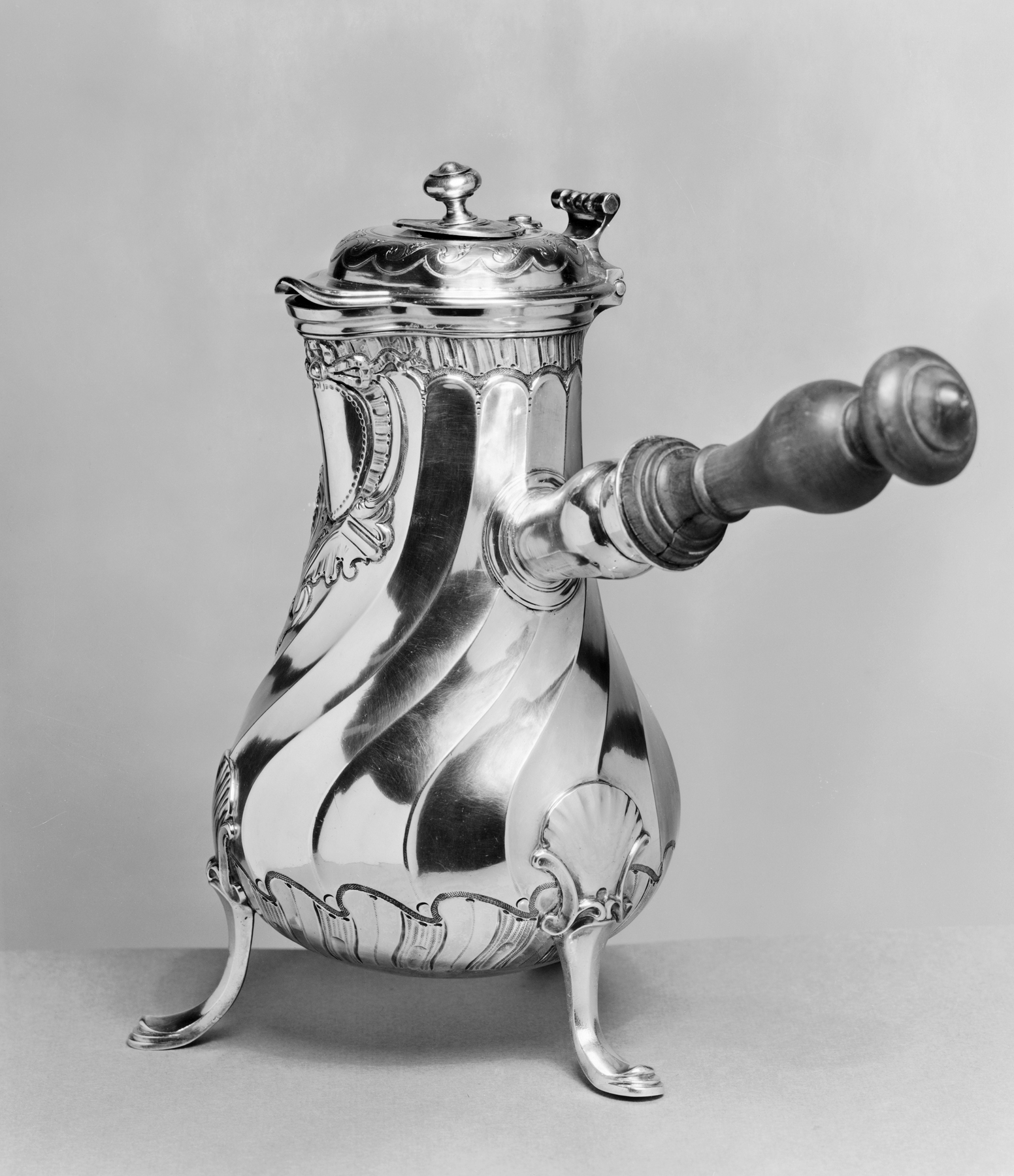
Chocolatiere

Records of metal and ceramic devices in France under the name chocolatière exist from 1671 in the letters of the aristocrat Madame de Sévigné. This device modified earlier ones, fixing a wooden handle 90° around the side of the pot from the spout, a wooden handle was fixed. The lid became opened via a hinge, and the hole covered by a finial that could be unscrewed or unhinged. The new devices were made from porcelain or, among nobility, silver or gold. Chocolate beverages could be made in the devices by placing a compressed brick or cake of chocolate inside with hot water and foaming with a molinillo (known as moussoir in French) inserted through the hole in the top. The hot, foamy chocolate drink could then be served into drinking vessels.

The device soon became dominant in Europe for making chocolate.

=== Thirteen Colonies ===
Records of silver chocolate pots in the Thirteen Colonies date from 1690 in New York, where they were soon considered fashionable and expensive. A range of shapes and designs were produced by Boston silversmiths working mainly in the early 18th century, including Edward Webb, Edward Winslow, John Coney, and Zachariah Brigden in shapes ranging from vase to pear, and in designs varying handle placement and strainer inclusion and designs. As of 2009, eight of these Boston silver chocolate pots survived.

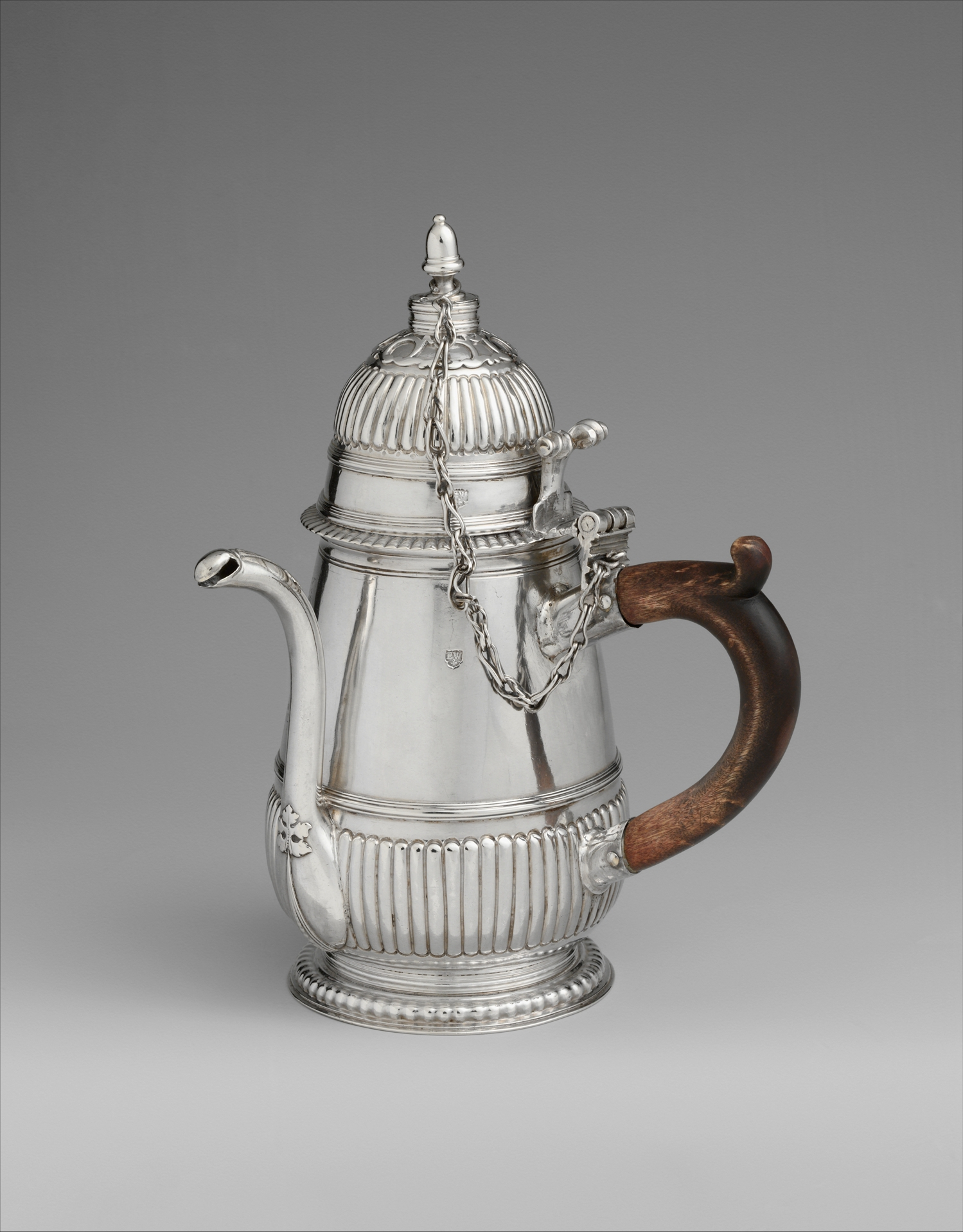
Edward Winslow, between 1700–1710

=== Decline ===
The use of chocolatieres declined in the 19th century, as the invention of techniques separating cocoa butter from chocolate and therefore chocolate powder eliminated the need for devices that could beat heavy chocolate drinks. In the 20th century, chocolatieres became valued for their appearance and history, and were collected.

== Modern ==
Chocolate pots continue to be produced in Spain and Mexico under the name chocolatera. In Spain, these are made from copper, while in Mexico the material varies by region: wood, carved from a single piece in Tabasco, and clay in Oaxaca, painted green. The role of Mexican chocolatera is beating chocolate to a foam and serving into drinking vessels, utilized after the chocolate has been boiled in a separate pot. These have a narrow appearance and can only contain around three servings of chocolate, as once the chocolate is beaten, the foam quickly dissipates. Since the late 20th century they have largely fallen from use.

== See also ==
- Chocolate drinking vessels
  - Coco chocolatero
  - Trembleuse
- History of chocolate
- List of chocolate drinks
- Coffeemaker
- Teapot

== Sources ==
- Coe, Sophie (1989). "The Maya Chocolate Pot and Its Descendants". In Jaine, Tom (ed.). Oxford Symposium on Food & Cookery, 1988: The Cooking Pot. London: Prospect Books. ISBN 0-907-32542-4.
- Coe, Sophie; Coe, Michael D (1996). The True History of Chocolate (1st ed.). New York: Thames & Hudson. ISBN 0-500-01693-3.
- Cowling, Erin Alice (2021). Chocolate: How a New World Commodity Conquered Spanish Literature. Toronto: University of Toronto Press. ISBN 978-1-4875-0329-1.
- Fernández de Oviedo, Gonzalo (1851). Amador de los Ríos, José (ed.). Historia general y natural de las Indias, islas y tierra-firme del mar océano (in Spanish). Vol. 1. Madrid: Real Academia de la Historia.
- Gray, Annie (2010). "Chocolatada! Sensing the Past: Recreating a 17th-Century Chocolate Recipe". In Symonds, James (ed.). Table Settings: The Material Culture and Social Context of Dining AD 1700–1900. Oxford: Oxbow Books. ISBN 978-1-84217-298-8.
- Shapiro, Howard-Yana; Grivetti, Louis E, eds. (2009). Chocolate: History, Culture, and Heritage. Hoboken, New Jersey: John Wiley & Sons. ISBN 978-0-470-12165-8.
  - Lange, Amanda. "Chocolate Preparation and Serving Vessels in Early North America". In Shapiro & Grivetti (2009).
  - Perkins, Suzanne. "Is It a Chocolate Pot? Chocolate and Its Accoutrements in France from Cookbook to Collectible". In Shapiro & Grivetti (2009).
- Henderson, John S; Joyce, Rosemary A; Hall, Gretchen R; Hurst, W Jeffrey; McGovern, Patrick E (November 2007). "Chemical and archaeological evidence for the earliest cacao beverages". Proceedings of the National Academy of Sciences. 104 (48): 18937–18940. doi:10.1073/pnas.0708815104. PMC 2141886.
- Loughmiller-Cardinal, Jennifer (2019). "Distinguishing the Uses, Functions, and Purposes of Classic Maya "Chocolate" Containers: Not All Cups Are for Drinking". Ancient Mesoamerica. 30 (1): 13–30. doi:10.1017/S0956536117000359.
- Medina, F Xavier (2005). Food Culture in Spain. Westport, Connecticut & London: Greenwood Press. ISBN 0-313-32819-6.
- Muñoz Zurita, Ricardo [in Spanish] (2012). Diccionario enciclopédico de la Gastronomía Mexicana [Encyclopedic Dictionary of Mexican Gastronomy] (in Spanish). Mexico City: Éditions Larousse. ISBN 978-607-21-0619-2.
- Poelmans, Eline; Swinnen, Johan (2016). "A Brief Economic History of Chocolate". In Squicciarini, Mara P; Swinnen, Johan (eds.). The Economics of Chocolate. Oxford University Press. ISBN 978-0-19-179326-4.
- Powis, Terry G; Valdez, Fred; Hester, Thomas R; Hurst, W Jeffrey; Tarka, Stanley M (March 2002). "Spouted Vessels and Cacao Use among the Preclassic Maya". Latin American Antiquity. 13 (1): 85–106. doi:10.2307/971742.
