= Grace and Thomas Tosier =

English chocolatiers

Grace Tosier (1664-1753) and Thomas Tosier (d.1733) were English chocolatiers of the Georgian era. Thomas worked for King George I from 1714, at Hampton Court Palace. Grace ran a booming chocolate drinking house on Chocolate Row in Greenwich. Both were celebrities of the day, widely covered in the London broadsheets.

== Life and work ==
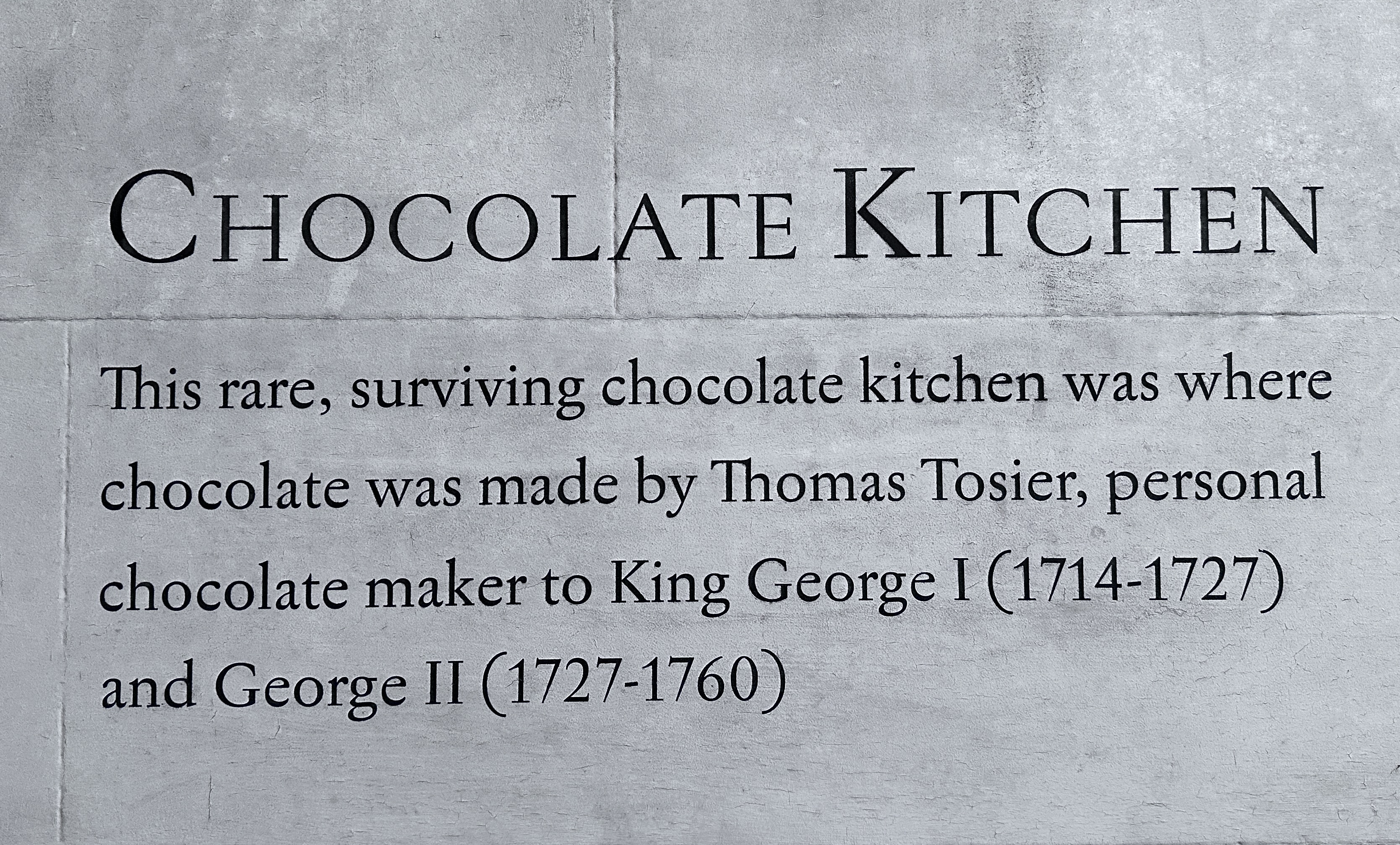
Thomas Tosier made chocolate in the Chocolate Kitchen, Hampton Court Palace.

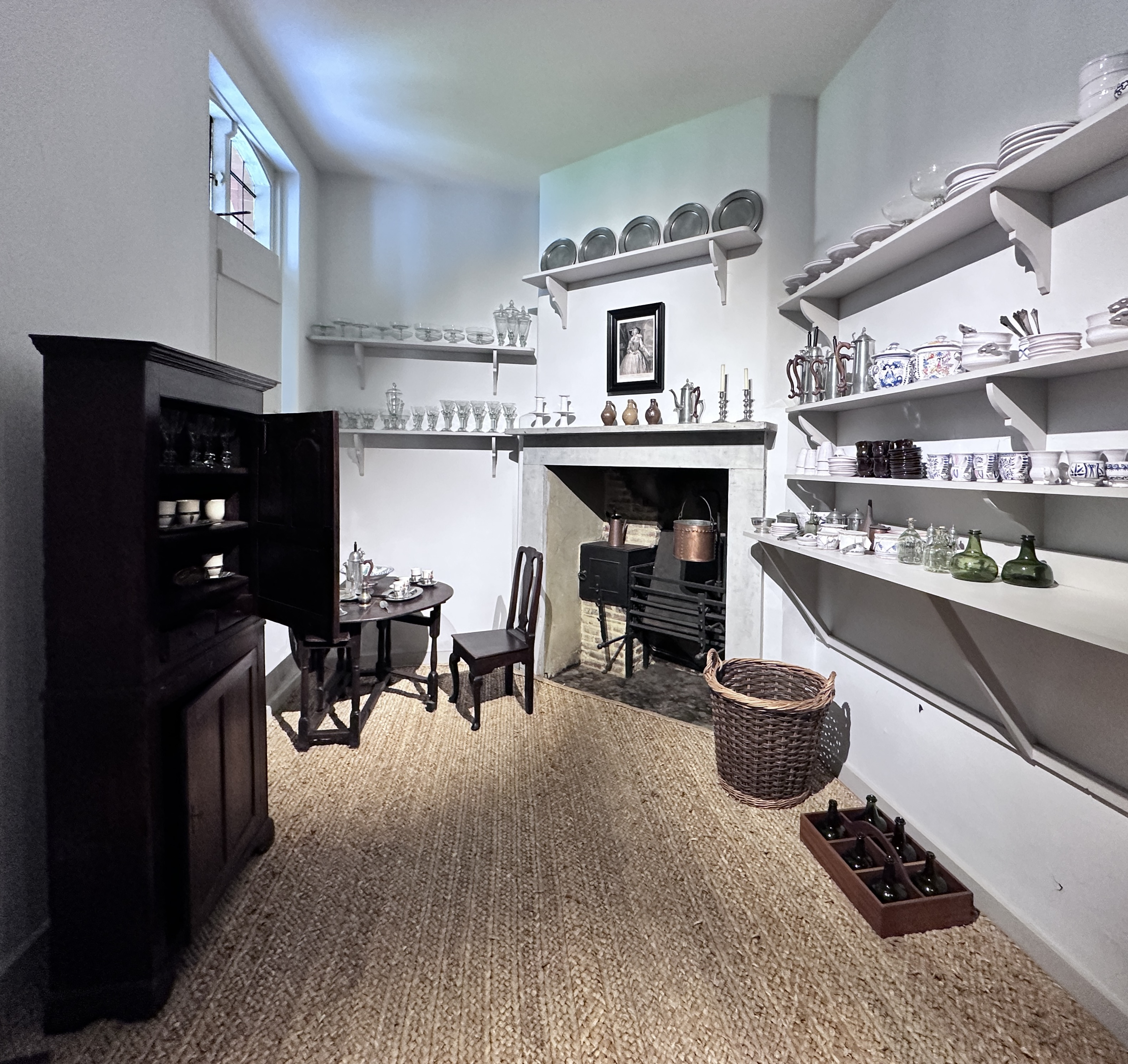
Thomas put the final touches to chocolate drinks in this Hampton Court Palace room.

Thomas Tosier had a highly paid role at Hampton Court Palace as George I's personal chocolatier and, unusually, had his own sleeping and working quarters away from the royal kitchens at the Palace, off the cloisters of William III’s Fountain Court. Each day Thomas would roast and cut the beans, gathering the cacao nibs within the husks. He then ground the nibs with a variety of liqueurs and spices as denoted by the king for daily consumption. The very thick drink was served in a silver chocolate pot with porcelain cups, usually for breakfast, in the royal apartments. Tosier's rooms, were part of Christopher Wren's restoration of the Palace, c. 1690. In 2013 they were restored for public viewing - the world's sole surviving Georgian chocolate kitchen. It is now a site for experimental archaeologists to recreate original Georgian recipes from the period.

Although chocolate had been imported from South America since the 15th century, it was only in the early 18th century that the boom came in European chocolate drinking, when it was discovered that sugar could be added to balance the natural bitterness of the beans. Imported exotic foodstuffs such as sugar, pepper, chilli, cardamom, chocolate and spices such as cinnamon now became inexpensive enough for common public consumption in the drinks. Increasing scale of production of chocolate and sugar was due to expanding British slave plantations in Jamaica. The chocolate houses became social hubs for the political radicals of the day. Quakers promoted the drinking of tea and coffee in their temperance campaign. The sugar and chocolate boom came in the years before the British abolitionist movement grew in power.

Following Thomas' royal success and fame, he and Grace set up an establishment on Chocolate Row in Greenwich. The name is variously cited as either the Chocolate Box or the Chocolate House. With roaring public favour, they expanded the property to include a dancing hall. Highlighting connections to the palace, Grace hosted dances in honour of the Restoration Day and King George's birthday. At Grace's soirées non-aristocrats, "Persons of Quality" [sic], could bask in the royal association. The events were widely reported by the press and gossip pages. The liberal attitude to the free, unregulated, uncensored press of the day, worked in favour of the Tosiers, who used it to become celebrities of London.

The couple attended and reserved pews at the Hawksmoor St Alfege Church, Greenwich. Grace was known for wearing ‘large brimmed hats’ and ‘flowers in her bosom’. As with other celebrities of the time, her outfits were described in magazines such as Tatler and the Gentleman’s Magazine.

Following Thomas' death in 1733, Grace married brewer Samuel Vancourt. Unusually for the time, she kept the Tosier name, as it was so well known. She was drawn by engraver John Faber Jr and by Bartholomew Dandridge. She died as a very wealthy woman in 1753, in her late eighties. Her portrait is now featured in the National Portrait Gallery, London.
