= Richard Diehl =

American archaeologist (born 1940)

Richard A. Diehl (born December 27, 1940) is an American archaeologist, anthropologist, academic, and scholar of pre-Columbian Mesoamerican cultures. He has made extensive contributions to the study of the Olmecs' civilization, which flourished in the Gulf Coast of Mexico region during the pre-classic period in Mesoamerica.

== Early life and education ==
Diehl was born in Bethlehem, Pennsylvania, United States, in 1940. He attended Penn State University, where he graduated with a BA degree in history. He then pursued graduate studies in anthropology at Penn State, earning his MA under the supervision of archaeologist William T. Sanders in 1965. His thesis was The Use of Ethnographic Data for Archaeological Interpretation of the Teotihuacan Valley, Mexico. In 1969, he received his PhD; his doctoral thesis was An Evaluation of Cultural Evolution in the Formative Period in Mesoamerican Prehistory, again with Sanders as his supervisor.

Diehl's experiences in archaeological fieldwork began as an undergraduate at Penn State. From 1961 to 1964, he participated in field trips to the Valley of Mexico, the archaeological locality in the central Mexican altiplano, where the major city and polity of Teotihuacan reached its apogee during the Classic era.

Working under the tutelage of Sanders, Diehl conducted research at Teotihuacan and other nearby sites, gaining experience in excavation techniques, archaeological field surveys and ethnography. As a graduate working towards his doctorate, Diehl worked with Yale University professor Michael D. Coe in the 1966–1967 field season at San Lorenzo Tenochtitlán, a major Olmec site in the Mexican state of Veracruz.

== Career ==
In 1969, Diehl began his academic career in the Department of Anthropology at the University of Missouri in Columbia, Missouri, which had been established two years earlier. Diehl remained at the University of Missouri for the next 18 years, lecturing and conducting archaeological research in Guatemala and Mexico.

In 1986, Diehl left the University of Missouri to join the anthropology department at the University of Alabama in Tuscaloosa as its departmental chair, a position he held until 1993. During a one-year sabbatical in 1993–94, Diehl served as acting director and curator of pre-Columbian Studies at the Dumbarton Oaks Research Library and Collection in Washington, D.C. From 1998 to 2005, Diehl served as executive director of the University of Alabama's museum systems, and was director of the Alabama Museum of Natural History.

Diehl retired from formal academia at the end of the 2007 academic year, after a career spanning over four decades. He retained the title of Professor Emeritus in the Department of Anthropology at the University of Alabama in Tuscaloosa. Diehl continues to be engaged in Mesoamerican and archaeological research, teaching classes and authoring publications on the Olmec and other archaeological subjects.
