= Edward Webb (silversmith) =

American silversmith (1666–1718)

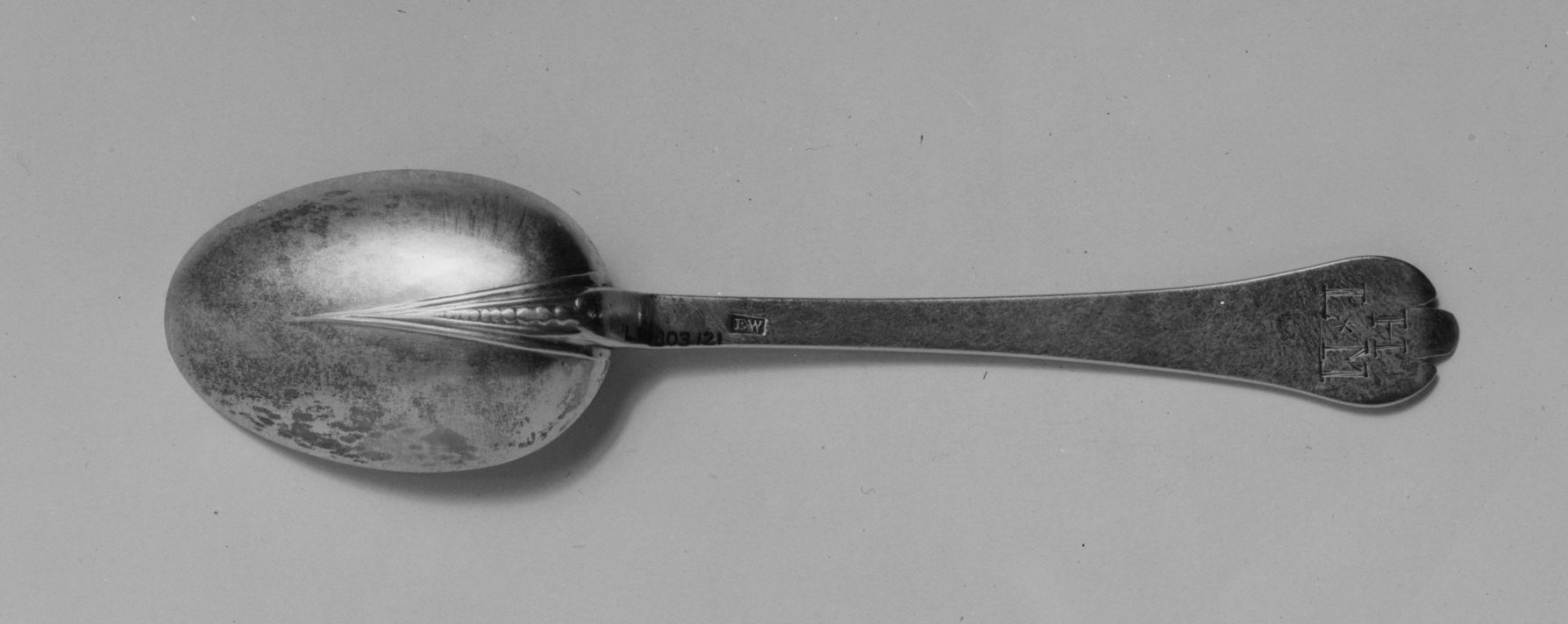
Spoon by Edward Webb

Edward Webb (c. 1666 – 1718) was a silversmith from the Thirteen Colonies, born in England but active in Boston. He apprenticed from 1680 until 1687 to William Denny, a London goldsmith, and may have been in Boston as early as 1704, but definitely by 1709. His work is collected in the Five Colleges Art Museums, Metropolitan Museum of Art, Museum of Fine Arts, Boston, and Yale University Art Gallery.
