= Trembleuse =

Cup and extra-secure saucer

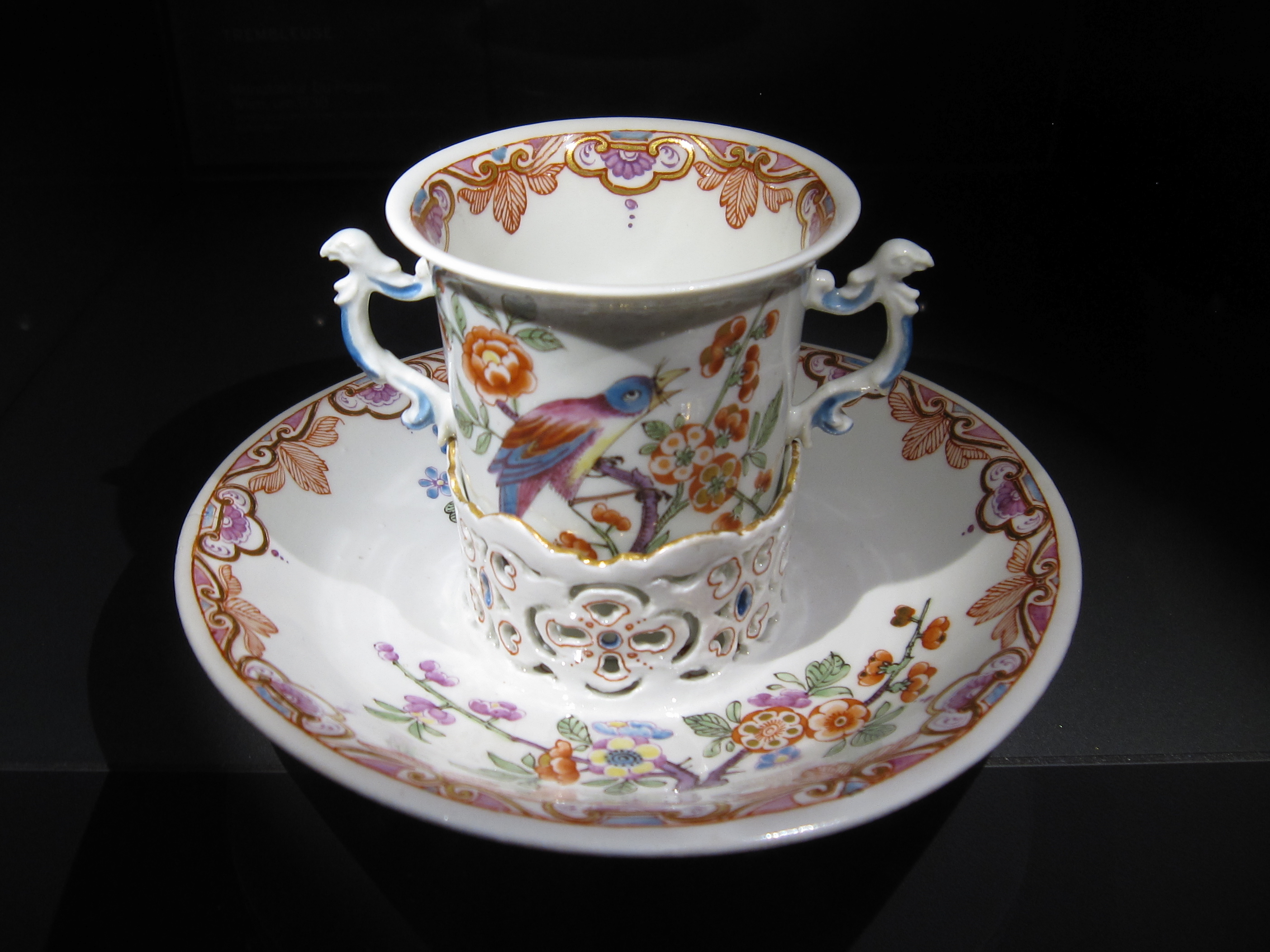
Vienna porcelain trembleuse cup with gallery from the du Paquier period, 1730

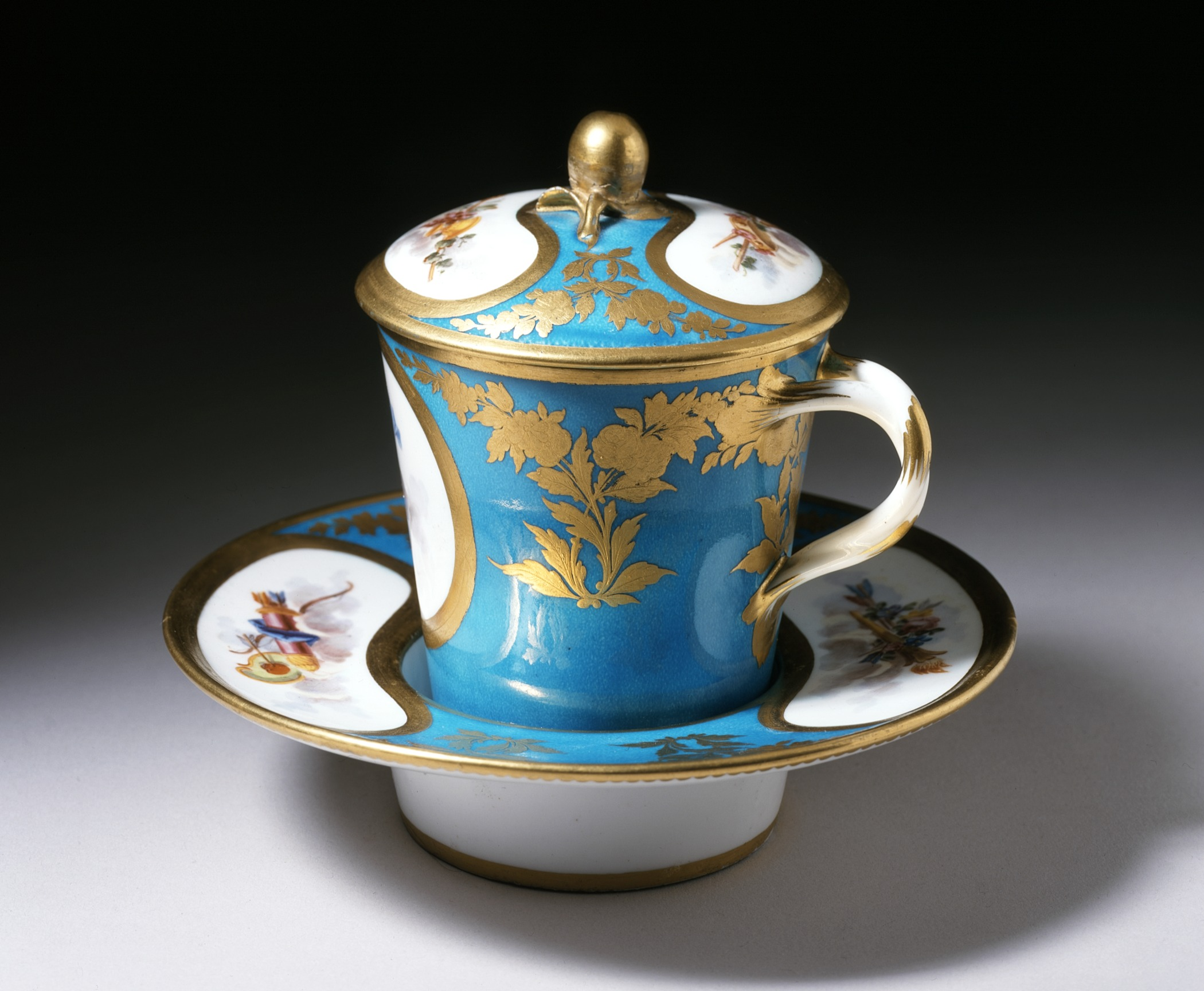
Gobelet et soucoupe enfoncé by Sèvres c. 1776

A trembleuse, also known as a tasse trembleuse or chocolate cup, is a pottery drinking cup and saucer with the saucer given a raised holding area, called the "gallery", in which the cup sits more securely than in the normal style. The saucer therefore becomes more of a cup holder than the normal shallow near-plate.

A different design – also often called a trembleuse, or gobelet et soucoupe enfoncé in 18th-century Sèvres catalogues – has a socket or well below the main plane of the saucer, in which the cup sits, achieving a similar effect of stability. The main plane of the saucer is raised high. In both types, the cups are mostly in porcelain (or bone china) with some in high quality earthenware such as creamware. The saucers normally match the cups, but are sometimes in silver, or even partly in gold.

== Usage ==
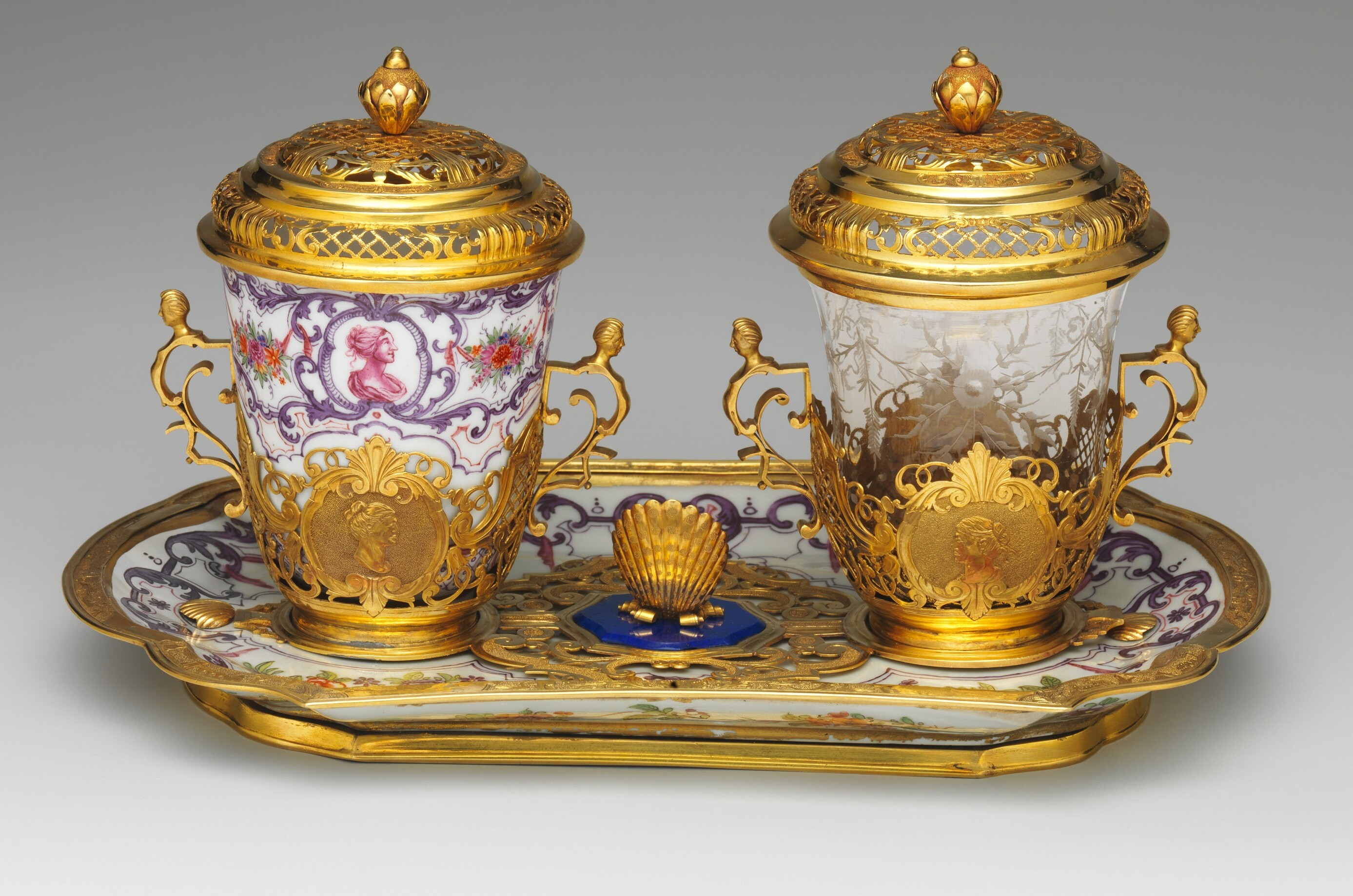
Vienna porcelain set of 1735–1740, small porcelain tray holding matching cup and water glass, both with gold galleries

They allowed people with a weak grip or a medical condition involving shaking or trembling hands to drink a beverage, initially tea or hot chocolate; whether this was the original motivation for the design is doubtful. Cups were designed with or without handles (two handles were common), and sometimes a lid. Typically the raised gallery of the saucer is in openwork. Cups made to fit in galleries normally had a flat base, but a narrower one than a tea or coffee cup. They were normally sold singly or in pairs, rather than in larger sets. The proliferation of specialized porcelain shapes for different purposes was encouraged, not to say driven, by the porcelain companies, whose customers wanted to be in the latest fashion.

A lavish Vienna porcelain set of 1735-40 has a small porcelain tray holding matching cup and water glass, both with gold galleries and covers. Between the two cups is a vertical gold shell shape to hold a spoon, set in a plaque of lapis lazuli. This is described as an "ensemble for chocolate" by the Metropolitan Museum of Art. There are two sets of gold handles for the cups, but these are in fact part of the galleries.

A well-known pastel, The Chocolate Girl (Das Schokoladenmadchen) by Jean-Étienne Liotard (now Gemäldegalerie Alte Meister, Dresden, c. 1743) shows a young maid carrying a tray with a Meissen trembleuse with a silver gallery, and a plain glass of water. A matching porcelain tray of this sort is called a présentoire.

The name "trembleuse", meaning "one (female) who trembles", is usually held to be 19th-century or later: in their 18th-century heyday they were called a variety of names by various manufacturers. Sèvres used the term Gobelet et soucoupe enfoncé for a saucer with a well in catalogues from 1759, also tasses à toilette et sou-coupes. Meissen used Schokoladetassen ("chocolate cup"), Vienna Schokoladebecher mit Einsatztasse, and Höchst Porcelain Kronenschale ("crowned cup").

However, the Sèvres records of the 1750s and 1760s refer to a "Gobelet et soucoupe trembleuse", which according to Adrian Sassoon is thought to refer to a different rare type of "deep saucer" that "has three large concave lobes within its high sides, with divisions that form buttresses to hold the cup in the center".

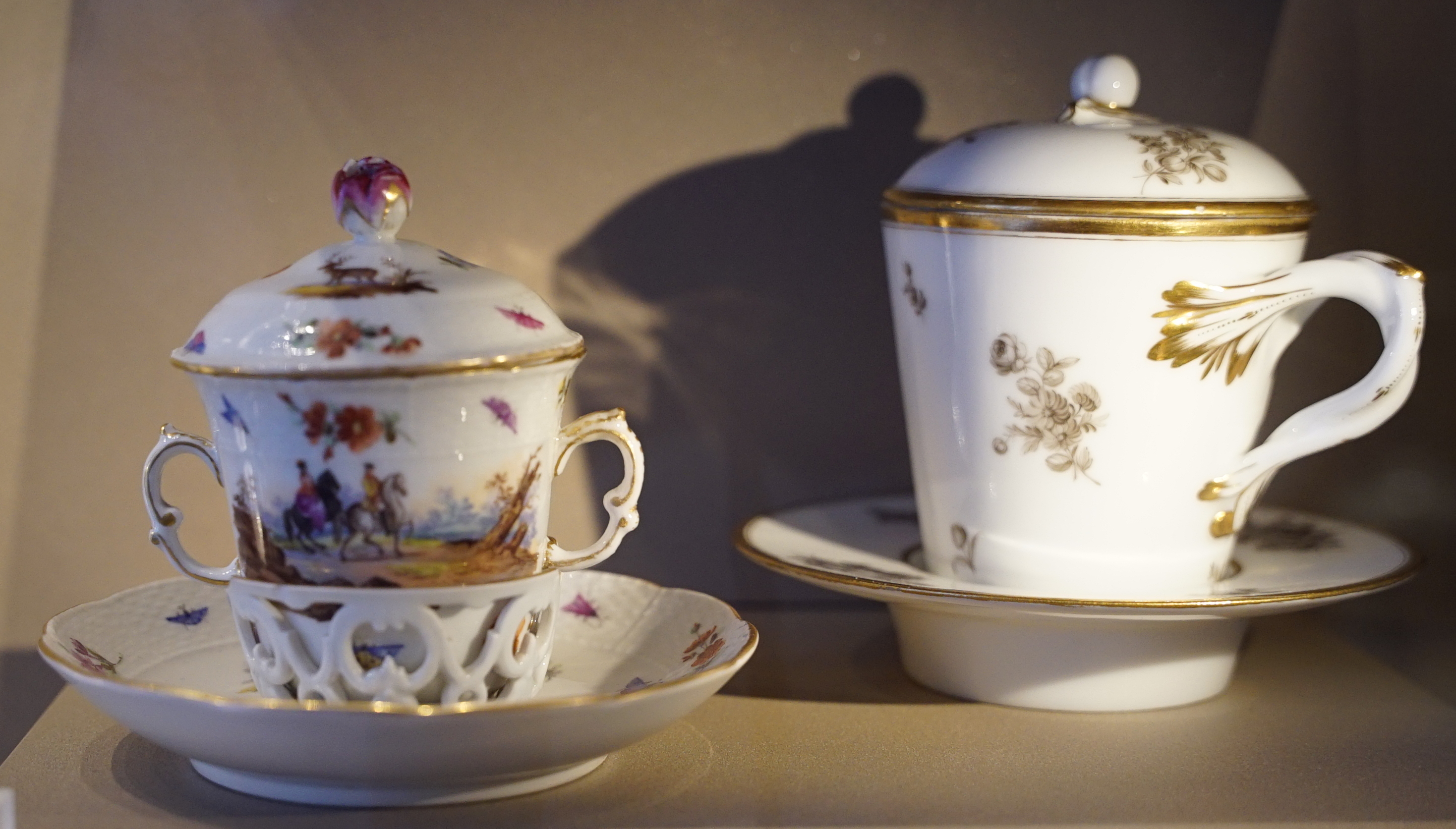
Examples of the two types

Many of the most famous porcelain manufacturers, such as Sèvres and Vienna, produced trembleuses, but they were not often made by English manufacturers in the 18th century. When they were they were called "chocolate cups", although "trembleuse" is often preferred today (especially by Americans). The saucer can be called a "chocolate-stand. However, cups with two handles and a cover are often called a "chocolate cup", when the saucer is the conventional type used by teacups.

The Metropolitan Museum of Art in New York City has a relatively unusual pair of cups, the saucers and galleries entirely in silver-gilt by the leading London silversmith Paul de Lamerie from 1713 to 1714, while the handleless cups are Italian Doccia porcelain.

== Origins ==
Such saucers with galleries had been common in Chinese ceramics for centuries, for example in Ru ware from the Song dynasty, where they are most often called "cup stands". In many Chinese examples the well in the stand is open at the bottom. As tea-drinking became popular in the Ottoman Empire the zarf cup-holder, somewhat like a large eggcup, developed, mostly to hold small Chinese export porcelain tea-bowls. Whether the Chinese or Turkish forms played a role in the emergence of the trembleuse is unclear. In Europe the trembleuse originated in Paris in the 1690s, and were originally associated with drinking chocolate rather than tea or coffee, perhaps more influenced by the Hispanic mancerina (see below) than the Asia types.

== Mancerina ==
A Spanish type, generally designed for a smaller handleless cup, and perhaps the original Western form, was introduced by, or at least named after, Pedro de Toledo, 1st Marquis of Mancera in the mid-17th century, when he was Viceroy of Peru. It was mostly used for drinking chocolate. In South America, the Spanish colonists took over the indigenous way of drinking chocolate: hot, strong and bitter, in very small cups either made from dried gourds, or replicating this shape in pottery. These cups lacked a stable base, which did not suit the Spanish, who therefore invented the galleried saucer to hold them.

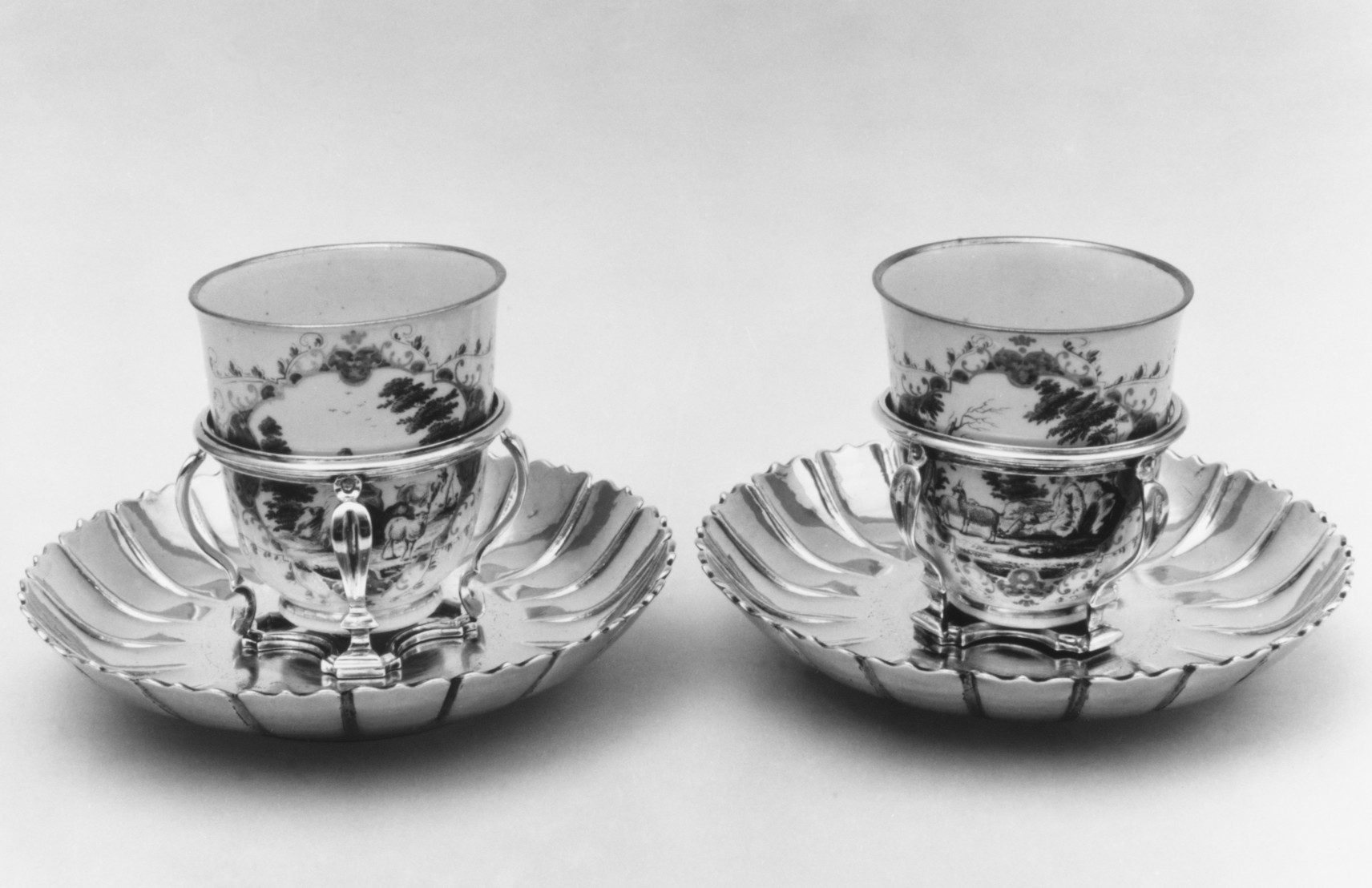
Pair, silver-gilt stands by Paul de Lamerie, London, cups by Doccia porcelain, Florence

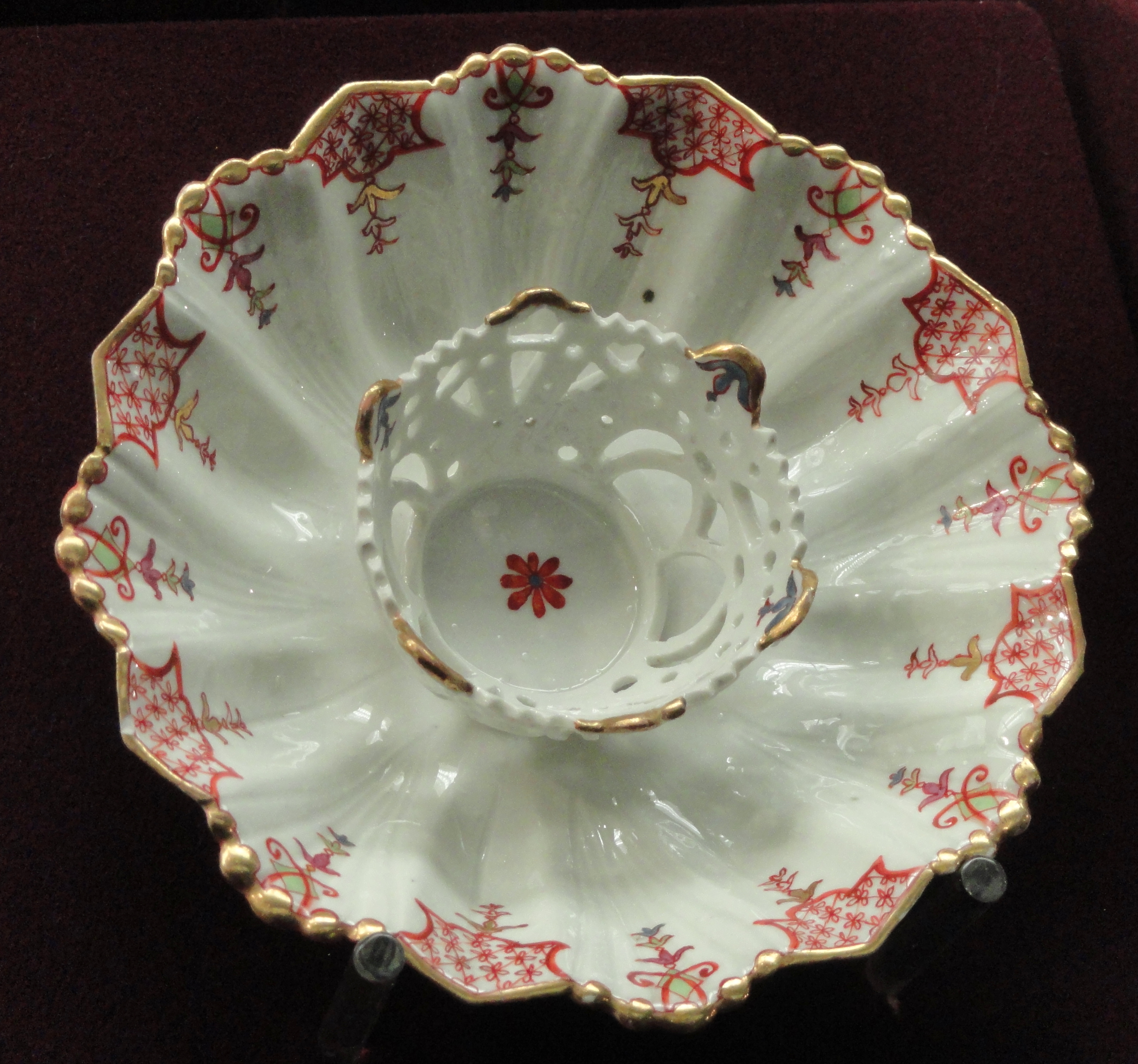
Saucer with gallery, Vienna, Du Paquier period

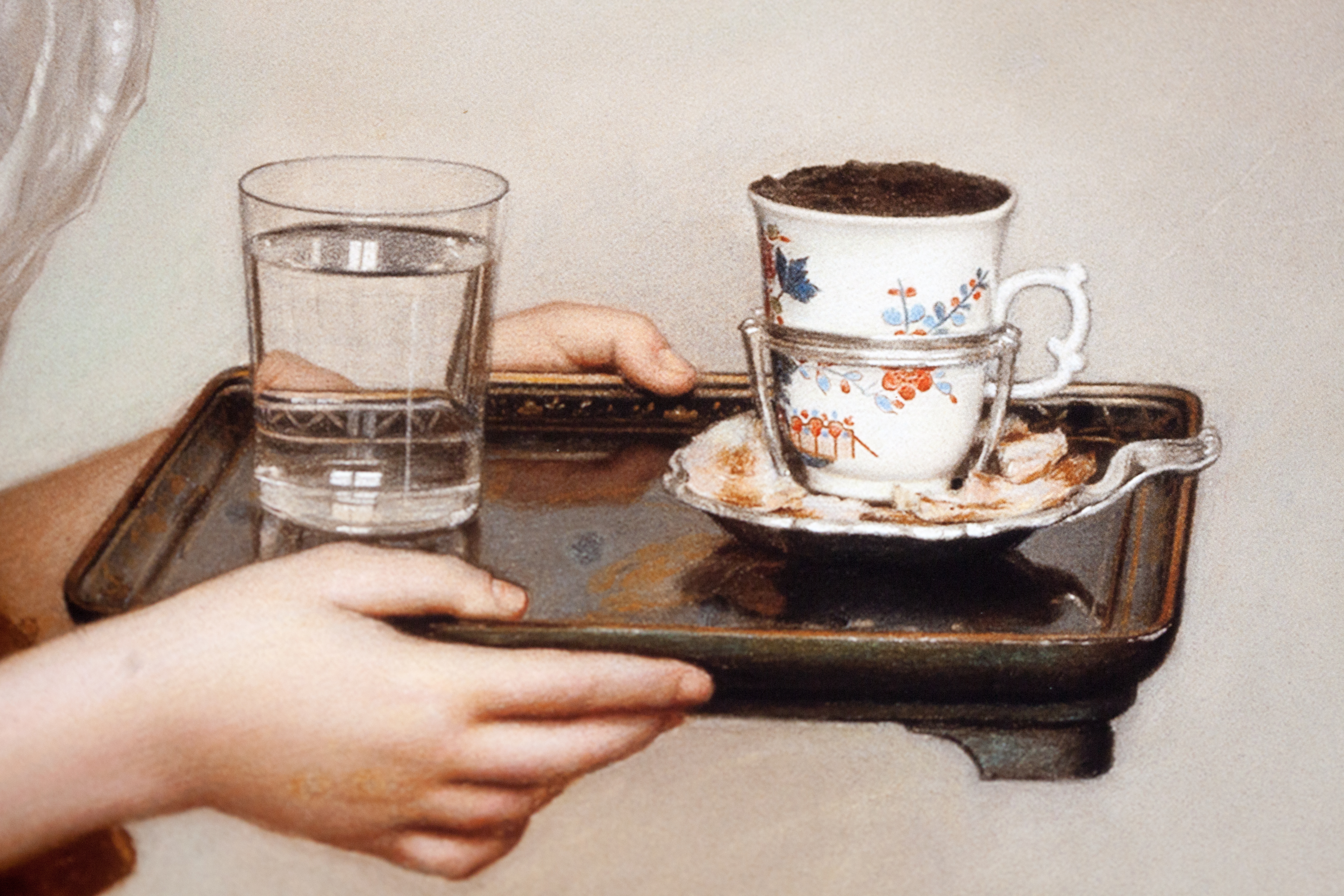
Detail of the tray with frothing cup of drinking chocolate from The Chocolate Girl by Jean-Étienne Liotard, c. 1743

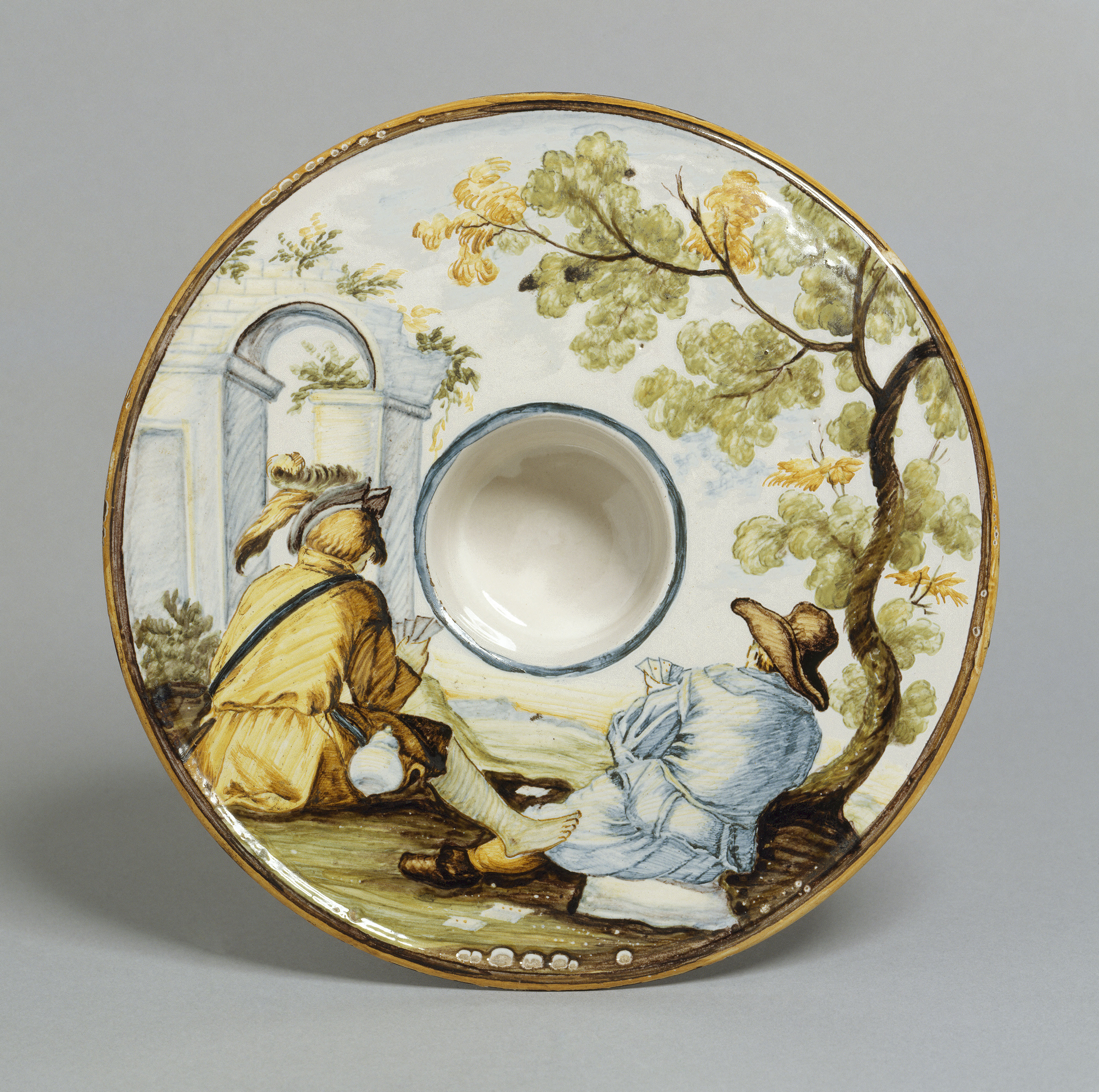
Saucer with well, Italian faience, mid-18th century

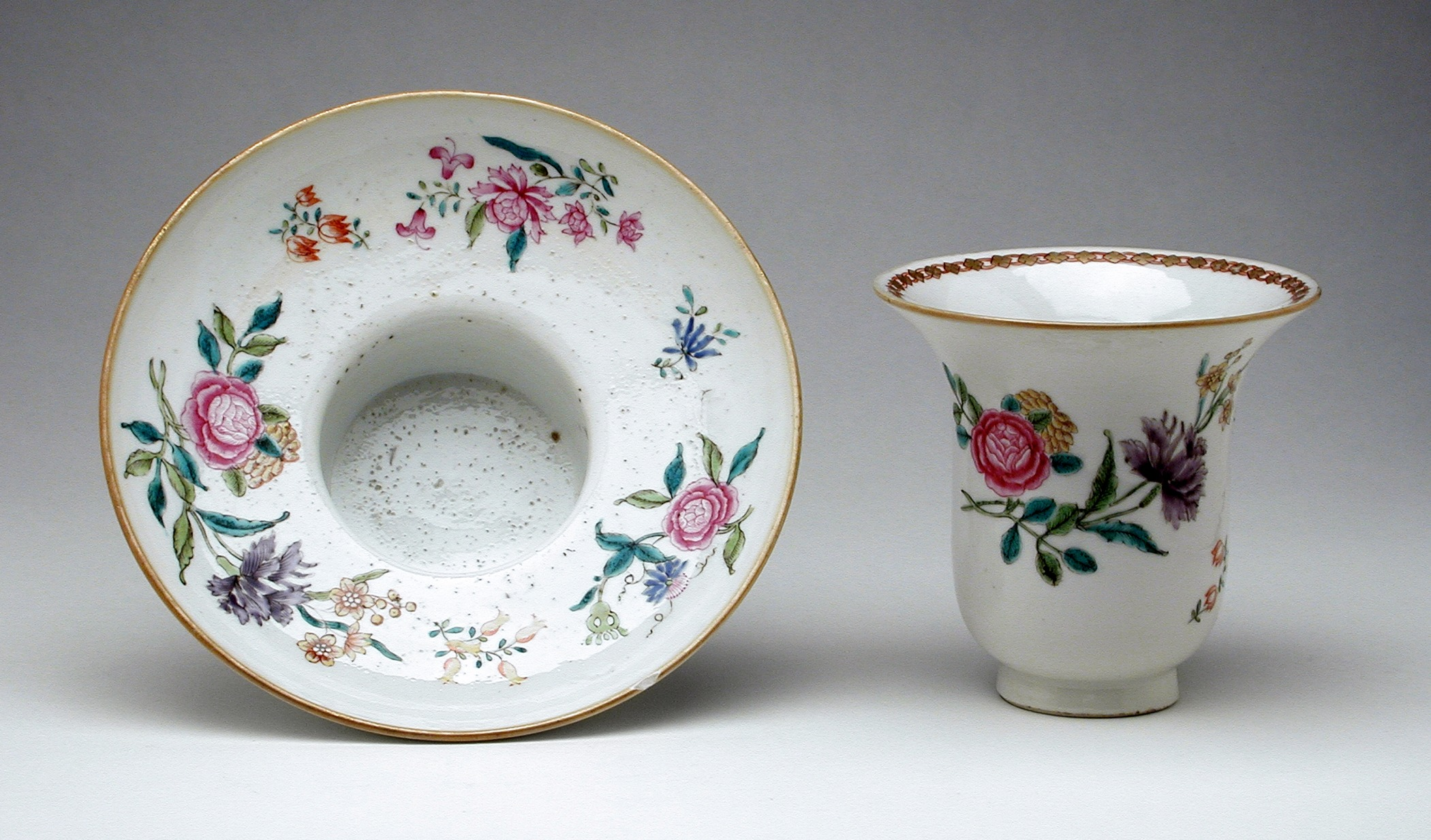
Chinese export porcelain, after 1750

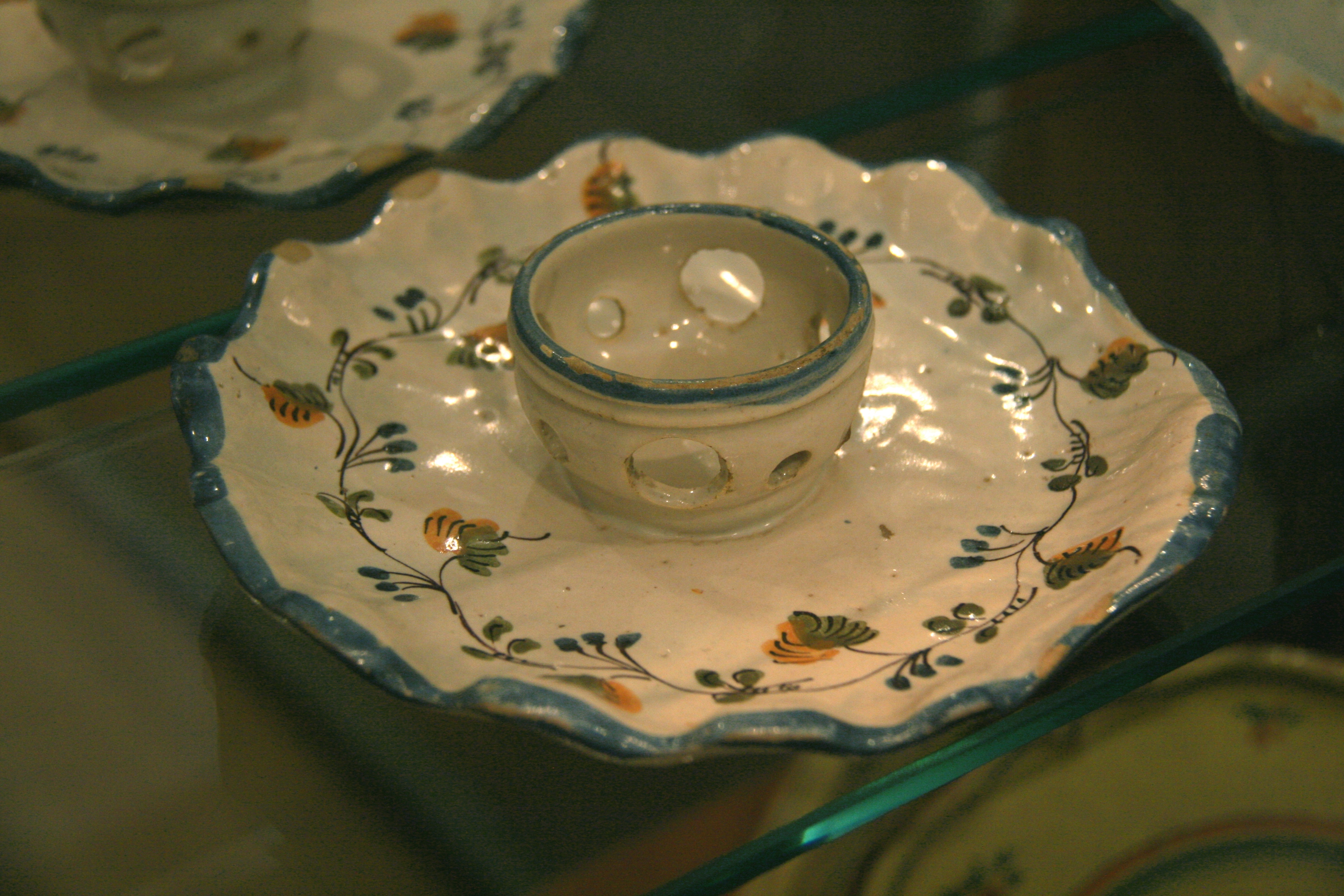
Spanish mancerina without cup

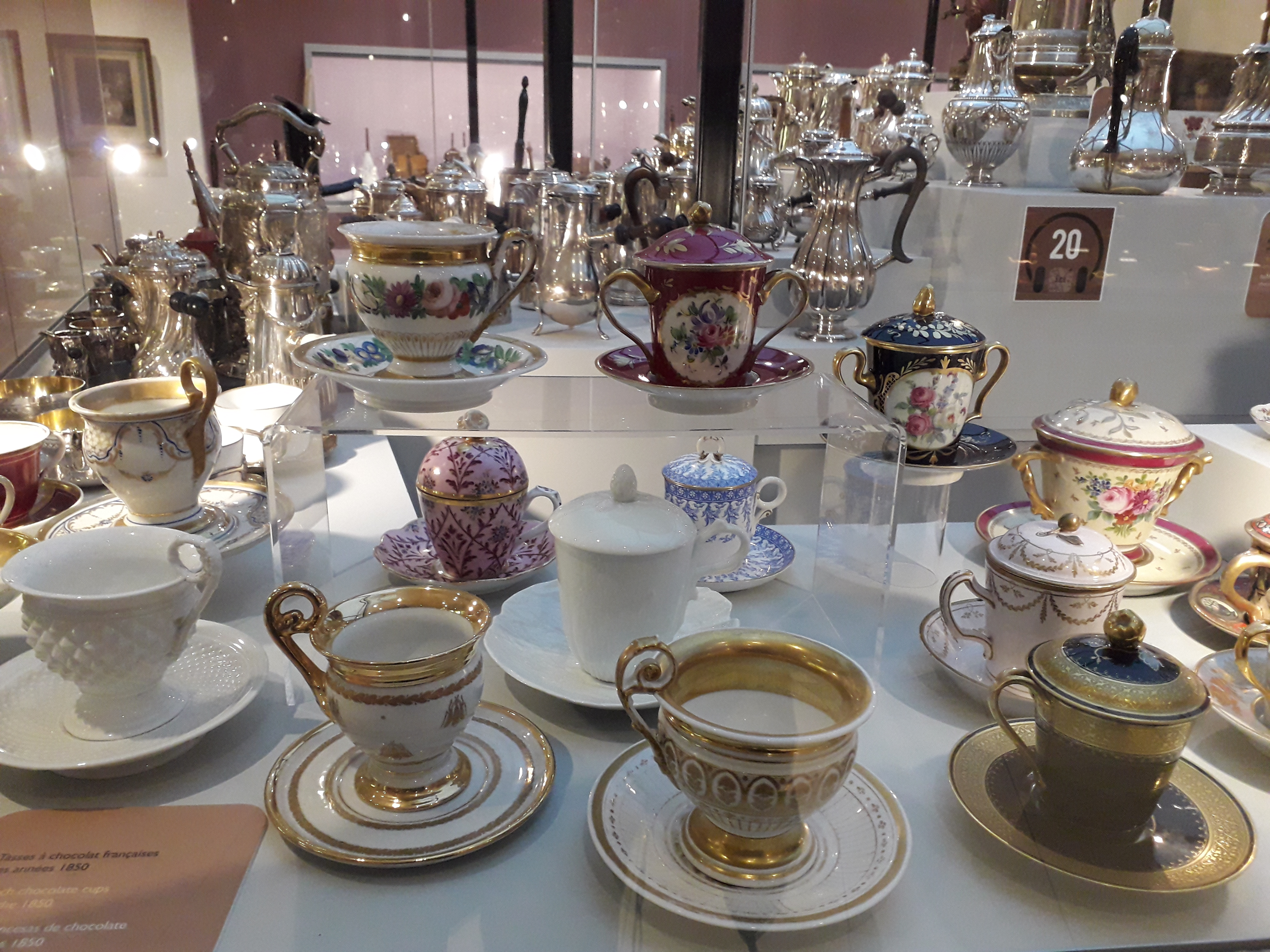
A variety of French 18th-century trembleuses

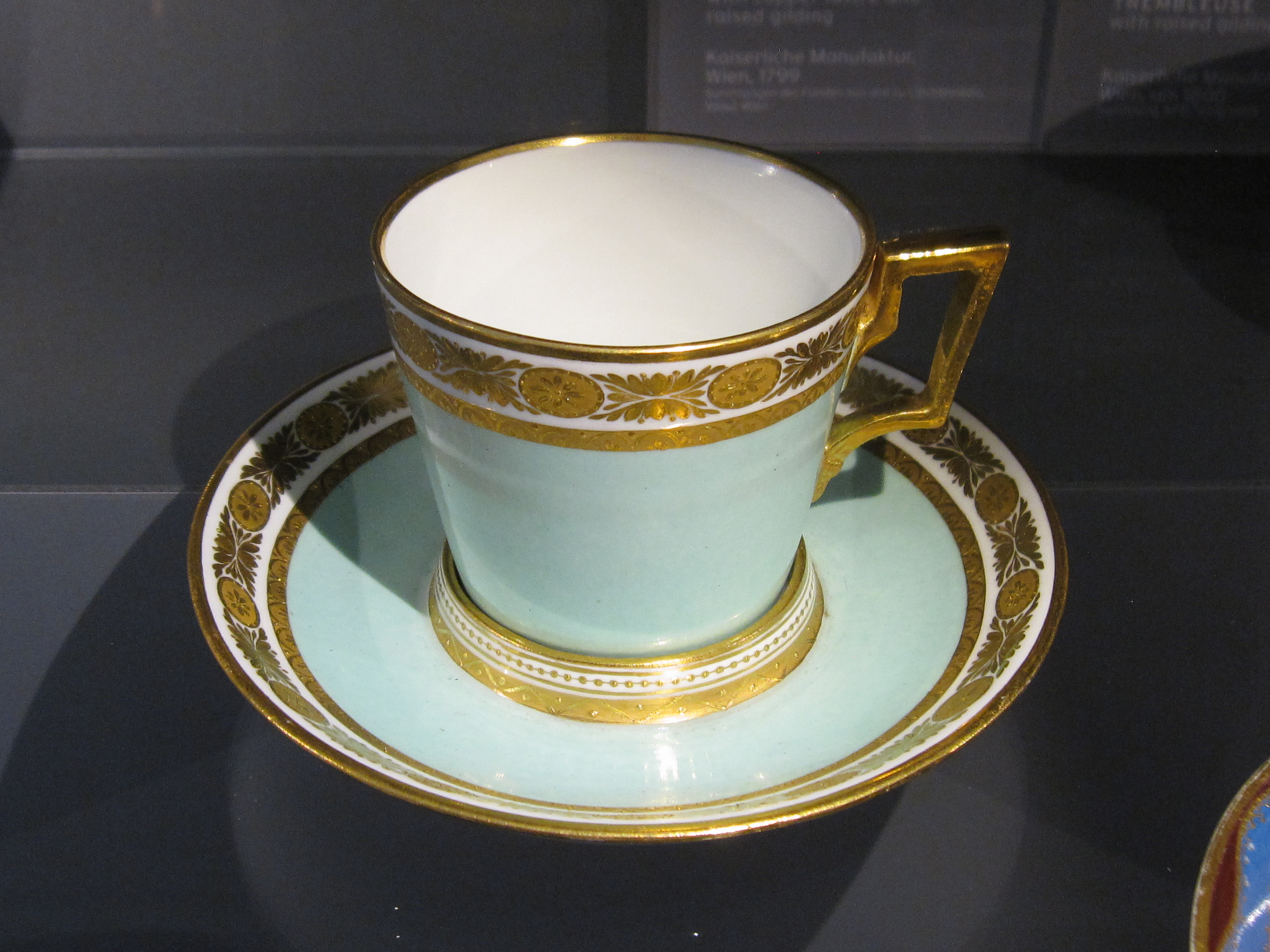
Vienna cup with low gallery, c. 1800
