= The True History of Chocolate =

1996 book by Sophie and Michael D. Coe

- First edition cover
- Author: Sophie and Michael D. Coe
- Genre: Popular history
- Publisher: Thames and Hudson
- Publication date: 1996
- ISBN: 0-500-01693-3

The True History of Chocolate is a popular history of chocolate by Sophie and Michael D. Coe, published in 1996.

Sophie Coe was a scholar on the cuisine of the pre-Contact Americas, and she developed the concept for a book on the history of chocolate out of a paper she presented at the 1988 Oxford Symposium on Food and Cookery. After five years of researching the topic further, she began writing. When she died the following year, her husband Michael completed the writing process. Over the text, the trajectory of chocolate and cacao from Mesoamerica to Europe is articulated, and the Coes propose several theories, including the idea that chocolate originated earlier than previously thought.

The True History of Chocolate was well-received in contemporary reviews for its writing and interdisciplinary research, and has continued to be viewed by scholars as an important text among books on chocolate and food studies generally. Academic Carla Martin describes the text as "the first book in the contemporary era, in English, that took chocolate as a serious field of study", and it has been credited with inspiring research and popular awareness on chocolate's origins. A decade after its release, evidence began to emerge challenging some of the Coes' theories.

== Writing ==
Sophie and Michael Coe

The True History of Chocolate was written by the husband-and-wife duo Michael and Sophie Coe, although originally Sophie was the sole author. She was an established scholar on the cuisine of the pre-Contact Americas. The concept for the book developed out of a paper Sophie presented in 1988 at the Oxford Symposium on Food and Cookery titled "The Maya Chocolate Pot and Its Descendants". Over the following five years, Sophie methodically researched chocolate and cacao's origins, generating thousands of pages of notes. Some of this research involved trips to Europe with Michael's accompaniment as she examined old texts in various libraries. In his memoir, Michael describes the book as emerging from research conducted for her 1994 book America's First Cuisines, after Sophie "realized that she'd not done full justice to chocolate". In 1993, Sophie began writing. The following March, she was diagnosed with a terminal cancer, and she died two months later.

Before her death, Michael promised he would finish writing the book. Michael was an anthropologist, a reputed professor at Yale on Mayan archeology. Though Sophie had planned the book's structure, she only completed one and a half chapters at her death. Using Sophie's notes, Michael worked to construct a book that would align with her vision, and on publication, he was credited as junior author. To reflect what he saw as the quality of the work's scholarship, Michael named the book after Bernal Díaz del Castillo's Historia verdadera de la conquista de la Nueva España (transl. The True History of the Conquest of Mexico). Two further editions followed; in the preface to the third, Michael wrote: "lest it be thought that it was some kind of burden or sacrifice for me to finish Sophie’s book, I want to state here that it was a true pleasure... I have learned much from Sophie, even posthumously."

== Contents ==
The book begins with a discussion of cacao: how and where it grows, its biological makeup, how it is processed and so on. It proceeds to a description of how the Maya and Aztec used cacao as a drink and currency. The Aztecs traded cacao, forming intricate trade routes and territorial disputes. Within Aztec society, cacao beverages differed and evolved over time. In this section, the Coes emphasize the origin of cacao in the Americas. Chapters four and five cover European encounters with chocolate; how the settling forces initially took advantage of the value ascribed to cocoa beans by indigenous people, expanding cultivation and trade, but disliked the taste of chocolate, and then introduced the drink to Europe. There, it was primarily drunk by the societal elite for taste and purported medical benefits, and competed with the other new beverages coffee and tea.

The text takes a chapter-long digression into how chocolate and cacao plantations moved to other parts of the world. Here, the Coes suggest chocolate did not become popular outside of Western nations (except the Philippines) due to cultural conservatism. Chapters seven and eight cover how chocolate gained popular uptake in Europe, and then became mass consumed through technological innovation. An epilogue describes how contemporary society engages with Mayan chocolate making, through tourism and chocolate produced with cacao grown by Maya peoples. As the text concludes, several issues are identified with contemporary chocolate production. These include a lack of attention to quality production in the UK and US compared to Continental Europe and unfair labor practices within cocoa production in developing countries.

Over the course of the book, the Coes challenge several then-common understandings of chocolate. They posited that the creation of chocolate and the domestication of cacao occurred earlier than previously thought, among the Olmec people circa 1000 BC. Their evidence was both archeological and linguistic, proposing for the latter that the word "cacao" was originally "kakawa". They challenged understandings of chocolate as exceptionally important to Aztec society.

In the journal International Labor and Working-Class History, scholars described the work as an application of Sidney Mintz's study of commodity chains.

== Reviews ==
Reviewers praised The True History of Chocolate for its use of anecdotes in writing and illustrations, with its prose being variously described as "spell-binding", "very engaging", and "a leisurely walk with chocolate along its peculiar history". A dissenting view was voiced in Kirkus Reviews, where a reviewer found stretches of text lacking anecdotes overly detailed and unengaging. Adolf Ceska writing for Botanical Electronic News found in The True History of Chocolate "a work of love" to chocolate, "history, life, and of a deceased spouse".

On release, the work was praised as among the best within the literature, with Jack Robertiello in Américas arguing it was the standard against which "other books about chocolate ... must now be judged." This was based in perception of the quality of the Coes' research, across fields of history, anthropology, cultural history, archeology, and ethnography.

Later commentary has criticized the book for shallow coverage of chocolate's relationship to slavery, and for the history of chocolate in Asia besides the Philippines.

== Legacy ==
The work has since been viewed as among the most important works on chocolate and generally within the field of food studies. The author of Cocoa, Kristy Leissle, describes the book's place in works on chocolate as of 2018: "If there is a canon of cocoa works, then it certainly begins with the inestimable volume ... [A True History of Chocolate, as it] set a high bar for all that followed." Academic Carla Martin in 2019 called the text "the first book in the contemporary era, in English, that took chocolate as a serious field of study."

With the publication of The True History of Chocolate emerged an increase in popular and scholarly interest in the origins of chocolate, for which the book has been credited. By the mid-2000s, the book was well known, and investigations at the time to uncover chocolate's origins attributed Coes' book as an inspiration. Around this time, research began to emerge challenging some of the theories put forward in The True History of Chocolate.

The publication of the book gave rise to popular awareness of the Mexican origins of chocolate. Its descriptions of Mesoamerican chocolate production, as well as those of early modern Europeans were suggested by anthropologist Ellen Schnepel in Gastronomica as a potential influence on practices by chocolatiers to produce chocolate according to older recipes.

== Sources ==
- Albala, Ken (Spring 2003). "Reviewed Work: Refined Tastes: Sugar, Confectionery, and Consumers in Nineteenth-Century America Wendy A. Woloson". Winterthur Portfolio. 38 (1). doi:10.1086/382165.
- Anderson, E. N. (March 2008). "Review: An Anthropology of Chocolate". American Anthropologist. 110: 1. JSTOR 27563884.
- Baghdiantz-McCabe, Ina (2015). A History of Global Consumption: 1500–1800. Abingdon, Oxfordshire; New York: Routledge. ISBN 978-0-415-50791-2.
- Ceska, Adolf (November 8, 1996). "New Publications - The True History of Chocolate". Botanical Electronic News. Vol. 149 (149 ed.). ISSN 1188-603X. Archived from the original on April 17, 1999.
- Coe, Michael D (2006). Final Report: An Archaeologist Excavates His Past. New York: Thames & Hudson. ISBN 978-0-500-05143-6.
- Cowling, Erin Alice (2021). Chocolate: How a New World Commodity Conquered Spanish Literature. Toronto: University of Toronto Press. ISBN 978-1-4875-0329-1.
- Eubanks, Mary W. (Oct–Dec 2000). "Review: The True History of Chocolate". Economic Botany. 54 (4). JSTOR 4256369.
- Leissle, Kristy (2018). Cocoa. Polity. ISBN 978-1-5095-1320-8.
- Hackenesch, Silke (2017). Chocolate and Blackness: A Cultural History. University of Chicago Press. ISBN 978-3-593-50776-7.
- Hanagan, Michael; Nekola, Peter (Fall 2006). "Better than Barraclough? Putting global labor history on the map". International Labor and Working-Class History. 70 (70): 143–154. doi:10.1017/S0147547906000202. JSTOR 27673052.
- Hayes, Joanne Lamb (April 1997). "Sweet truth". Country Living. Vol. 20, no. 4. p. 100.
- Medrich, Alice (Summer 2006). "Review: Chocolate: A Bittersweet Saga of Dark and Light". Gastronomica. 6 (3). doi:10.1525/gfc.2006.6.3.98.
- Mintz, Sidney W.; Du Bois, Christine M. (2002). "The Anthropology of Food and Eating". Annual Review of Anthropology. 31 (1): 99–119. Bibcode:2002ARAnt..31...99M. doi:10.1146/annurev.anthro.32.032702.131011.
- Mitsuda, Tatsuya (2014). "From Reception to Acceptance: Chocolate in Japan, c. 1870–1935". Food & History. 12 (1): 175–200. doi:10.1484/J.FOOD.5.105148.
- Powis, Terry G.; Cyphers, Ann [in Spanish]; Gaikwad, Nilesh W.; Grivetti, Louis; Cheong, Kong (24 May 2011). "Cacao use and the San Lorenzo Olmec". Proceedings of the National Academy of Sciences of the United States of America. 108 (21): 8595–8600. Bibcode:2011PNAS..108.8595P. doi:10.1073/pnas.1100620108. ISSN 0027-8424. PMC 3102397. PMID 21555564.
- Robertiello, Jack (March–April 1997). "From the old world to the new". Américas. Vol. 49, no. 2. p. 63. ISSN 0379-0940.
- Schmid, Rudolf (August 1997). "Three Books on Chocolate—One for the Coffee Table, Two for the Bookshelf". Taxon. 46 (3): 609–610. doi:10.2307/1224424. JSTOR 1224424.
- Schnepel, Ellen M. (Fall 2009). "Dark Pleasures". Gastronomica. 9 (4): 93–95. doi:10.1525/gfc.2009.9.4.93.
- Smith, Harrison (September 30, 2019). "Michael Coe, influential archaeologist and Maya scholar, dies at 90". The Washington Post.
- "Sophie D. Coe: Her Work, Her Collection, and Her Prize". Harvard Radcliffe Institute. 24 July 2013. Archived from the original on 18 January 2021.
- Švepeš, Václav (2015). "Sophie Coe — Michael Coe, The True History of Chocolate, London 2013" (PDF). Prague Papers on the History of International Relations (1). Archived (PDF) from the original on October 5, 2024.
- Tibère, Valentine (September 2011). "Primordial seed: The chocolate of the dawn life". Artes de México. 103. JSTOR 24318969.
- "The True History of Chocolate". Kirkus Reviews. No. 7. April 1, 1996. ProQuest 917208939 – via Proquest.
