= Sophie Coe =

American anthropologist, food historian and author (1933–1994)

Coe as a student at Radcliffe, c. 1955

Sophie Coe (née Dobzhansky; July 7, 1933 – May 25, 1994) was an American anthropologist, food historian, and author born to Soviet immigrants in Southern California.

Coe studied native New World cooking and the history of chocolate. She co-authored The True History of Chocolate (1996), which was completed posthumously by her widower, Michael D. Coe.

With the help of her husband and friends, the Sophie Coe Prize was created in her honor and is currently awarded annually to an outstanding and original essay or book chapter in food history.

== Early life and education ==
Sophie Dobzhansky's parents, Natalia Sivertzeva and Theodosius Dobzhansky, the geneticist and evolutionary biologist, had emigrated to the United States from the USSR in 1927. Sophie, their only child, was born in Pasadena, California in 1933, and the family moved to New York in 1940, when she was seven years old. In the late 1940s and early 1950s, Dobzhansky spent her summers assisting at the Cold Spring Harbor Laboratory, where Barbara McClintock, the Nobel Prize-winning cytogeneticist, was said to value the gentleness with which Dobzhansky cared for her experimental plants.

Dobzhansky graduated in 1955 from Radcliffe College with a major in anthropology, where she mastered Russian and Portuguese, and was known for keeping a pet tarantula in a bottle. She married shortly before graduation and received her Ph.D. in anthropology from Harvard in 1964.

== Career ==
Coe translated selected chapters of Yuri Knorozov's "The Writing of the Maya Indians" (1967). Knorosov based his studies on De Landa's phonetic alphabet and is credited with originally breaking the Maya code. Coe's translation played a major role in legitimizing his previously derided theories. She also studied native New World cooking, writing a number of scholarly essays for Petits Propos Culinaires (PPC). Her research in this area culminated in America's First Cuisines (1994). This work contained a substantial amount of material on chocolate, which she decided to expand upon for her next book, The True History of Chocolate (1996). She became seriously ill during its research and writing; it was published posthumously in 1996, having been completed by her widower, Michael D. Coe. It is now in its third edition.

Coe built an extensive collection of books on culinary history, nearly 1,000 volumes from around the world dating from the eighteenth century onward, as well as a group of manuscript cookbooks. She donated her collection of community cookbooks to the Schlesinger Library before her death, and afterward, her husband gave the library the rest of her collection.

After her death, Michael Coe, with the help of their friends Alan Davidson and Harlan Walker, set up the Sophie Coe Prize, a charitable trust based in the UK. The prize is awarded annually at the Oxford Symposium on Food & Cookery (which Coe attended every year) to an outstanding and original essay or book chapter in food history.

== Personal life ==
On 5 June 1955, the summer of her undergraduate graduation and the day before her final exam in Byzantine history, Dobzhansky married Michael D. Coe in a Russian Orthodox ceremony in New York City. Coe was a professor at Yale, an archaeologist, and anthropologist known for his work on Maya civilisation and pre-Columbian Mesoamerican. They travelled and worked together extensively. In 1969, they bought Skyline Farm, in Heath, Massachusetts, where Sophie honed her cooking and gardening skills. They had five children. Coe died of cancer in 1994.

== Works ==
=== Books ===
- Coe, Sophie D., America's First Cuisines (1994), ISBN 0292711557 (hardback); ISBN 029271159X (paperback)
- Coe, Sophie D. and Michael Coe, The True History of Chocolate (1996; 2003; 2013), Thames and Hudson, New York. ISBN 0500290687 (paperback), ISBN 978-0500290682 (hardback)

=== Articles ===
- Coe, Sophie D. and Michael D. Coe. 1957 Review of Diego de Landa: Soobshchenie o delakh v lsukatani, 1566, by Y. V. Knorosov. American Antiquity 23 (2): 207–208.
- Coe, Sophie D. (trans.), Knorosov, Yuri V. 1958 "The Problem of the study of the Maya Hieroglyphic writing." American Antiquity 23: 248–291.
- Coe, Sophie. "On Kulich." Petits Propos Culinaires (PPC) 12 (1982): 19-
- Coe, Sophie. "Soviet Cook Books." Petits Propos Culinaires (PPC) 16, March (1984): 13–27.
- Coe, Sophie. "Aztec Cuisine Part I." Petits Propos Culinaires (PPC) 19, March (1985): 11–22.
- Coe, Sophie. "Aztec Cuisine Part II." Petits Propos Culinaires (PPC) 20, July (1985): 44–59.
- Coe, Sophie. "Aztec Cuisine Part III." Petits Propos Culinaires (PPC) 21, November (1985): 45–56.
- Coe, Sophie. "Eating Guinea Pigs in Italy. (Notes and Queries)" Petits Propos Culinaires (PPC) 28, April (1988): 63.
- Coe, Sophie. "Inca Food: Animal and Mineral." Petits Propos Culinaires (PPC) 29, July (1988): 7–17.
- Coe, Sophie. "Inca Food: Vegetable." Petits Propos Culinaires (PPC) 31, March (1989): 29–38.
- Coe, Sophie. "Peru: The Inca and the Spaniards." Petits Propos Culinaires (PPC) 37, May (1991): 27–39.
