= Michael D. Coe =

American archeologist, anthropologist, epigrapher, and popular author (1929–2019)

- Born: Michael Douglas Coe; May 14, 1929; New York City, U.S.
- Died: September 25, 2019 (aged 90); New Haven, Connecticut, U.S.
- Known for: Maya civilization
- Scientific career
- Fields: anthropology, archaeology, epigraphy

Michael Douglas Coe (May 14, 1929 – September 25, 2019) was an American archaeologist, anthropologist, epigrapher, and author. He is known for his research on pre-Columbian Mesoamerica, particularly the Maya, and was among the foremost Mayanists of the late twentieth century. He specialised in comparative studies of ancient tropical forest civilizations, such as those of Central America and Southeast Asia. He held the chair of Charles J. MacCurdy Professor of Anthropology, Emeritus, Yale University, and was curator emeritus of the Anthropology collection in the Peabody Museum of Natural History, where he had been curator from 1968 to 1994.

Coe authored a number of popular works for the non-specialist audience, several of which were best-selling and much reprinted, such as The Maya (1966) and Breaking the Maya Code (1992). With Rex Koontz, he co-authored the book Mexico: From the Olmecs to the Aztecs, published in 1962.

== Early life and education ==
Coe was born in New York City, the son of designer Clover Simonton and banker William Rogers Coe. He attended Fay School in Southborough, Massachusetts, and St. Paul’s School in Concord, New Hampshire. He graduated from Harvard College in 1950, and he received his PhD in anthropology from the Harvard Graduate School of Arts and Sciences in 1959.

In 1955, shortly after commencing his graduate studies program at Harvard University, he married Sophie Dobzhansky, the daughter of the noted evolutionary biologist and Russian émigré Theodosius Dobzhansky. She was then an undergraduate anthropology student at Radcliffe College. Sophie translated the work of Russian mayanist Yuri Knorozov, The Writing of the Maya Indians (1967). Knorozov based his studies on De Landa's phonetic alphabet and is credited with originally breaking the Maya code.

Coe's brother, William Robertson Coe II, was also a prominent Mayanist, associated with the University of Pennsylvania. The two brothers had a falling-out in the 1960s and rarely spoke of each other afterward.

During the Korean War, Coe worked as a CIA case officer and as a part of a front organization, Western Enterprises in Taiwan, as part of efforts to counter the influence of the Mao Zedong regime in China.

== Career ==
Coe's graduate advisor was Gordon Willey. In his Harvard dissertation at La Victoria, Guatemala, he established the first secure chronology of ceramics for southern Mesoamerica. With Richard Diehl at San Lorenzo Tenochtitlán, he used new magnetometry techniques to locate and salvage most of the Olmec colossal heads now known, such that he is now considered one of the discoverers of the Olmec.

Coe and his students have contributed greatly to the decipherment of Maya writing. He championed Yuri Knorozov and the phonetic approach to decipherment, against the public rebukes of J. E. S. Thompson. At Yale University he taught the Mayanists Peter Mathews, Karl Taube, and Stephen D. Houston, the latter of whom collaborated with David Stuart.

He sometimes collaborated with his Yale colleague, anthropological linguist Floyd Lounsbury. Coe also advised the authors of The Blood of Kings, a work about Classic Maya rulership, Mary Ellen Miller, at Yale, and Linda Schele, at the University of Texas at Austin. Coe's Breaking the Maya Code (1992), which describes these breakthroughs, was nominated for a National Book Award.

Coe was the first to date El Baúl Stela 1 correctly (Coe 1957; cf. Parsons 1986:61); this sculpture from the Southern Maya Area (SMA) is one of three known with Cycle 7 Long-count dated monuments, predating all Lowland Long-count dated sculptures. With Kent V. Flannery, he was the first to observe that the greatest southern area site, Kaminaljuyu, probably profited greatly from its proximity to and exploitation of the enormous El Chayal obsidian fields. Coe discovered the Primary Standard Sequence, a sequence of hieroglyphs appearing around the rim of many Classic Maya ceramic vessels. Coe organized an exhibit of some of those ceramics at the Grolier Club in New York, where he also publicized, for the first time, a newly-discovered Maya codex — the first found in the Americas — and only the fourth known to exist. Some of Coe's other insights were given in casual comments to his students or in short reports, including that the Popol Vuh was but a fragment of a great lost pan-Maya mythology, and that Classic Maya rulers were shamanic figures as well as administrators.

Aside from his work on the Maya, his short paper published during the height of processual archaeology, entitled "The Churches on the Green", which imagined how that approach would fail to discern the origins and purpose of three churches on the New Haven Green if they were studied five thousand years later. His book on the Angkor civilization of ancient Cambodia, Angkor and the Khmer Civilization (2003, 2nd ed. 2018), was described by David P. Chandler as "the most thoroughgoing, accessible, and persuasive synthesis of precolonial Cambodian history, society and culture" that he had ever read.

=== Debates ===
Coe added qualified support to the "Cultura Madre" view of the Olmec as the "mother culture of Mesoamerican civilization". His use of information obtainable from looted Maya ceramics attracted criticism. Some of Coe's work in the Olmec field came under scrutiny by two scholars of Pre-Columbian art. For example, his work on the Cascajal Block and on the Wrestler was called into question.

The scholars disputed his claims and found his work inadequately supported by evidence. The Cascajal block was argued to have many features fully consistent with Olmec imagery. The same was said for the Wrestler. Their criticisms were based on what the other scholars considered poorly defined or undefined notions of Olmec iconography and of rulership.

== Personal life ==
Coe married Sophie Dobzhansky in a Russian Orthodox ceremony in New York City on the June 5, 1955. They travelled and worked together extensively. In 1969, they bought Skyline Farm in Heath, Massachusetts. They had five children: Nicholas, Andrew, Sarah, Peter, and Natalie.

After Sophie died of cancer in 1994, Michael helped complete her book, The True History of Chocolate.

== Death ==
Coe died on September 25, 2019, in New Haven, Connecticut, at age 90.

== Awards and recognition ==
- 1981: Senior Fellowship, National Endowment for the Humanities
- 1986: Member, National Academy of Sciences
- 1989: Tatiana Proskouriakoff Award, Harvard University
- 2000: Hitchcock Professorship, University of California, Berkeley
- 2001: James D. Burke Prize in Fine Arts, Saint Louis Art Museum
- 2004: Orden del Quetzal, Republic of Guatemala
- 2006: Orden del Pop, Museo Popol Vuh, Universidad Francisco Marroquín, Guatemala

== Publications ==
- Coe, Michael D. (1961) La Victoria, An Early Site on the Coast of Guatemala. Papers vol. 53. Peabody Museum of Archaeology and Ethnology, Harvard University, Cambridge.
- Coe, Michael D. (1962) Mexico. Thames and Hudson, New York. (Four subsequent editions; with Rex Koontz, 2013).
- Coe, Michael D. (1965) The Jaguar's Children: Pre-Classic Central Mexico. Museum of Primitive Art, New York.
- Coe, Michael D. (1966) The Maya. Thames and Hudson, New York. (8th ed. 2011, 9th ed. in press).
- Coe, Michael D. and Kent V. Flannery (1967) Early Cultures and Human Ecology in South Coastal Guatemala. Smithsonian Contributions to Anthropology, Vol. 3, Washington, D. C.
- Coe, Michael D. (1968) America's First Civilization: Discovering the Olmec. American Heritage Press, New York.
- Coe, Michael D. (1973) The Maya Scribe and His World. The Grolier Club, New York.
- Coe, Michael D. (1978) Lords of the Underworld: Masterpieces of Classic Maya Ceramics. Princeton University Press, Princeton.
- Coe, Michael D. and Richard A. Diehl (1980) In the Land of the Olmec. 2 vols. University of Texas Press, Austin.
- Coe, Michael D. and Gordon Whittaker (1983) Aztec Sorcerers in 17th Century Mexico: The Treatise on Superstitions by Hernando Ruiz de Alarcón. Institute for Mesoamerican Studies, Albany.
- Coe, Michael D. (1992) Breaking the Maya Code. Thames and Hudson, New York. (revised ed. 1999)
- Coe, Michael D. (1995) The Olmec World: Ritual and Rulership. The Art Museum, Princeton University, Princeton.
- Coe, Sophie D. and Michael D. Coe (1996) The True History of Chocolate. Thames and Hudson, New York.
- Coe, Michael D. and Justin Kerr (1998) The Art of the Maya Scribe. Harry N. Abrams, New York.
- Coe, Michael D. and Mark Van Stone (2001) Reading the Maya Glyphs (2nd ed. 2005)
- Coe, Michael D. (2003) Angkor and the Khmer Civilization. Thames and Hudson, New York (2nd ed. with Damian Evans 2018).
- Coe, Michael D. (2006) Final Report: An Archaeologist Excavates His Past. Thames and Hudson, New York.
- Coe, Michael D. (2006) The Line of Forts: Historical Archaeology on the Colonial Frontier of Massachusetts. University Press of New England, Lebanon.
