= History of chocolate =

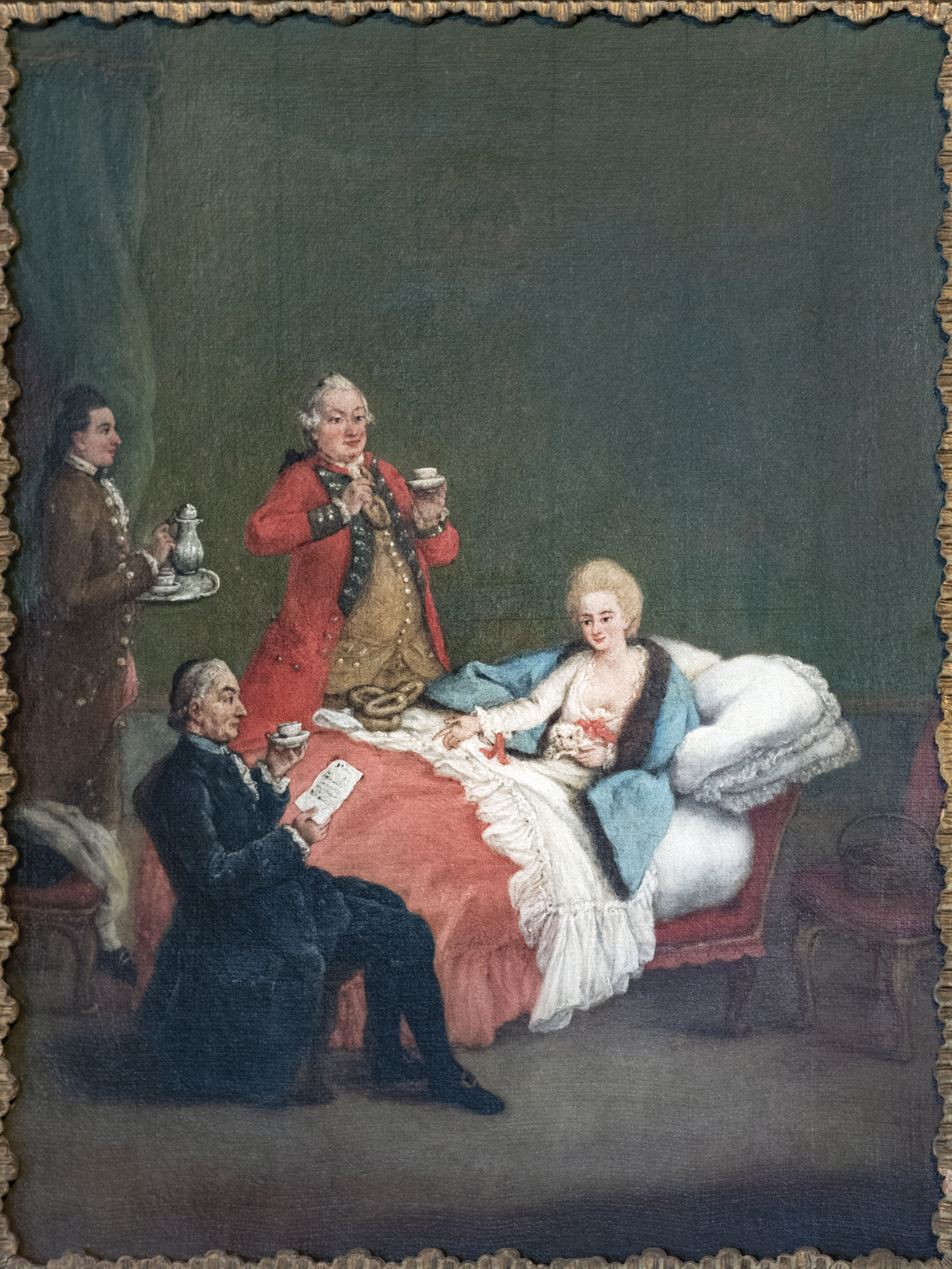
The morning chocolate by Pietro Longhi; Venice, 1775–1780

The history of chocolate dates back more than 5,000 years, when the cacao tree was first domesticated in present-day Ecuador. Soon after domestication, the tree was introduced to Mesoamerica, where cacao drinks gained significance as an elite beverage among cultures including the Maya and the Aztecs. Cacao was considered a gift from the gods and was used as currency, medicine, and in ceremonies. A variety of cacao-based drinks existed, including an alcoholic beverage made by fermenting the pulp around the seeds, however, it is unclear when a drink that can strictly be defined as chocolate first originated. Early evidence of chocolate consumption dates to 600 BC, when it was often associated with the heart and believed to have psychedelic properties.

Spanish conquistadors encountered cacao in 1519 and brought it to Spain, where it was used as a form of medicine. From there, it spread through Europe over the following three centuries, gaining popularity among elites. It was debated for its medicinal and religious merits, and sometimes regarded as an aphrodisiac. Following the transformation of chocolate from an elite drink into a solid, widely consumed product due to technological innovations, the 19th century saw the rise of Swiss and British chocolate makers, as well as the industrialization of production.

Since World War I, chocolate has continued to evolve, leading to the development of couverture and white chocolate. Manufacturers have also introduced alternative ingredients such as cheaper fats and lecithin. Production increased dramatically in the 20th century, with new markets emerging in Asia and Africa. Awareness of labor exploitation, especially child labor, has shifted attitudes toward chocolate production. As of 2018, the global chocolate trade was valued at over US$100 billion, concentrated among a relatively small group of cocoa processors and chocolate manufacturers.

== Etymology ==
Chocolate is a Spanish loanword, first recorded in English in 1604 and in Spanish in 1579. Its precise origins are debated. It is popularly thought to derive from the Nahuatl word chocolatl, as early texts use the term cacahuatl ("cacao water") for cacao drinks. Another hypothesis links it to the proposed Nahuatl word xocoatl, meaning "bitter drink", though scholars Michael and Sophie Coe argue against this, noting inconsistencies in the phonetic shift from "x" (sh) to "ch". A further theory suggests derivation from chocolatl in a Mayan language, meaning "hot water", though there is no evidence that chocol was used to mean hot.

Some scholars argue it may come from the Nawat word chikola:tl, possibly meaning "cacao-beater", in reference to whisking cacao to produce foam. However, the meaning of chico remains uncertain. Anthropologist Kathryn Sampeck suggests that chocolate originally referred to a specific cacao beverage made with annatto in what is now Guatemala. By about 1580, when the Izalcos were major cacao producers, the word expanded to mean cacao beverages in general.

== Early pre-Columbian ==
=== Cacao domestication in South America ===
The cacao tree is native to the Amazon rainforest. Evidence of cacao domestication exists as early as circa 3300 BC in present-day southeast Ecuador by the Mayo-Chinchipe culture, before it was introduced to Mesoamerica. This emerged from research into residue in ceramics, which revealed starch grains specific to the cacao tree, residue of theobromine (a compound found in high levels in cacao), and fragments of ancient DNA with sequences unique to the cacao tree. The domesticated cacao tree was then spread along the Pacific coast of South America. It is unclear when a drink that could be considered chocolate was first consumed, as opposed to other cacao beverages, given that there is evidence the Olmecs fermented the sweet pulp surrounding the seeds into an alcoholic beverage.

=== Mesoamerica ===
Cultivation, consumption, and cultural use of cacao were extensive in Mesoamerica. Inhabitants of ancient Mesoamerica created varietals of cacao that grew abundant, high-quality fruit. The earliest evidence of cacao drink consumption in the region dates to the Early Formative Period (1900–900 BC). On the Pacific coast of Chiapas, Mexico, the Mokayan people consumed bitter frothy watery cacao drinks by 1900 BC. Archaeological evidence from the Gulf Coast of Veracruz, Mexico, demonstrates cacao preparation by pre-Olmec peoples by 1750 BC. Traces of cacao have been found in bowls and jars dated between 1851 and 1045 BC in the city of Puerto Escondido, Mexico. The decorations on these ceramics suggest that cocoa was a centerpiece to social gatherings among people of high social status.

Although there is evidence that the Olmec consumed cacao as a beverage, little evidence remains on how it was processed. Some evidence suggests cacao consumption in the Olmec regions of San Lorenzo Tenochtitlán. Large vases found suggest that the Olmec used cacao for mass gathering events such as sacrificial rituals.

== Mayan ==
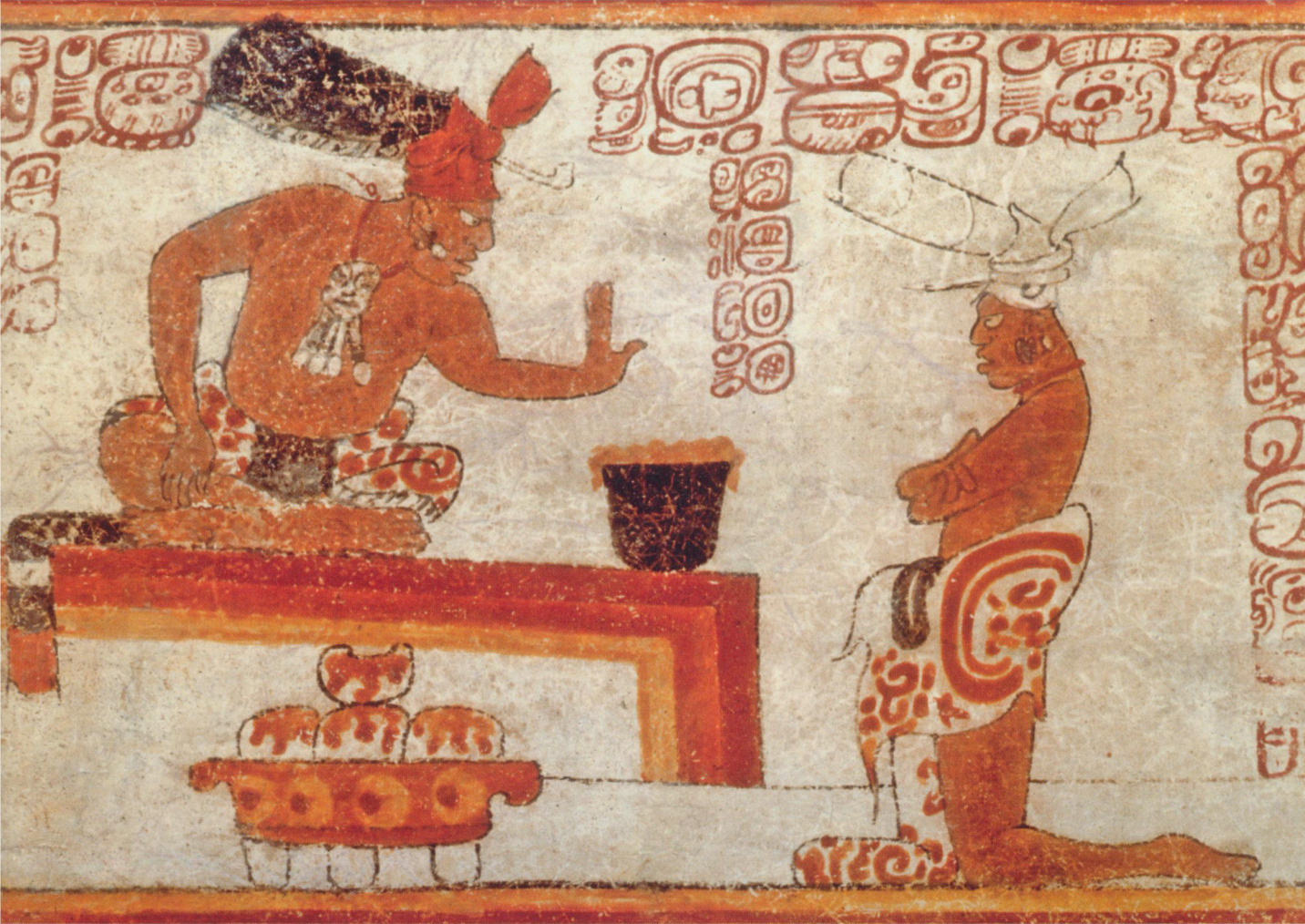
Image from a Maya ceramic depicting a container of frothed chocolate

Early evidence for chocolate consumption is found among the Maya, in 600 BC. Chocolate was used in official ceremonies and religious rituals, at feasts, weddings, and festivals, as funerary offerings and for medicinal purposes. Both cocoa beans and the vessels and instruments used for preparing and serving chocolate were given as gifts and tributes. It is unknown how, or if, commoners consumed chocolate. According to Grivetti (2008), consumption was restricted to adult men, as the stimulating effects were considered unsuitable for women and children. Cocoa beans were also used as a currency by at least 400 BC. Cocoa's social and religious significance motivated rich hobbyist gardeners to cultivate it in Yucatán, despite the challenging growing conditions. Nevertheless, most cocoa consumed was imported, primarily from Chontalpa, Tabasco.

To make chocolate, cacao beans were fermented, dried and roasted. The Maya then removed the husks and pounded the nibs with manos (stones) on a metate (stone surface) built over a fire, turning them into a paste. This paste was hardened into solid chunks, which were broken up and mixed with water and other ingredients. When heated, a fat called cocoa butter rose to the surface and was skimmed off. The basic process of fermenting, roasting, and milling with metates continued unchanged until the 19th century.

Cacao paste was flavored with additives such as vanilla and earflower (the latter when toasted tasted of white pepper). Before serving, chocolate was poured from a height between vessels to create a highly sought-after brown foam. This process also emulsified some cocoa butter that had been added back in. To assess the quality of the drink, the Maya observed the darkness of the foam, the color of the bubbles and the aroma, as well as the origin of beans and the flavor. Chocolate was only one of several drinks made at this time out of cacao, including a drink containing maize and sapote seeds called tzune and a gruel called saca. There is uncertainty about how fresh cacao and its pulp were used in drinks.

The Maya produced writings about cacao that associated chocolate with the gods, identifying Ek Chuah as the patron god of cacao. There is controversy among historians about whether the mythological figure Hunahpu was believed to have invented cacao processing. Through various eras, cacao was considered a gift from the gods. In the late Mayan and during the Aztec periods, there was a strong symbolic connection between cacao and blood.

After the collapse of the Mayan Empire, control over cocoa-producing regions became a source of conflict between the Toltec and rival tribes. Chocolate was consumed as far north as the southern US by the elite of the Ancestral Puebloans. During the 9th to 12th centuries, cocoa was imported as part of a cacao-turquoise exchange within a Toltec-run trade network. The Maya introduced chocolate to the Aztecs.

== Aztec ==
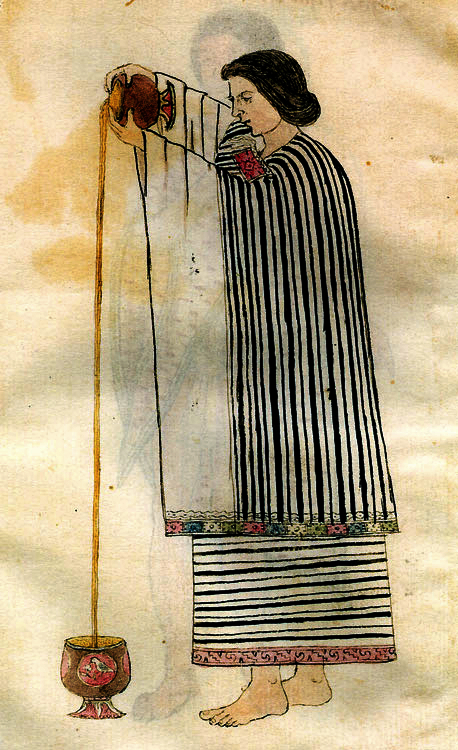
An Aztec woman generating foam by pouring chocolate from one vessel to another in the Codex Tudela

Chocolate was one of the two most important drinks to the Aztecs. It was a luxury, held in particular esteem as the other important drink, octli, was alcoholic, and drunkenness was stigmatized. Chocolate was regarded as a luxurious and sensual product to be celebrated, but at the same time consumption was considered at odds with an imagined austere idealized past, being overly decadent and weakening drinkers. It was incorrectly believed to be hallucinogenic. The Aztecs believed cacao was a gift from the god Quetzalcōātl. The bean was used as a symbol for the heart removed in human sacrifice, possibly as they were both thought to be repositories of precious liquids—blood and chocolate. The association with blood was reinforced by adding annatto, a food coloring, to turn the drink red.

The Aztecs used chocolate in tributes to rulers and offerings to the gods. Aguilar-Moreno (2006), citing Colonial Spanish sources, says chocolate was drunk exclusively by the Aztec elites, including the royal house, lords, nobility, and long-distance traders known as pochteca. At banquets, chocolate was served as a digestif at the end. According to Coe and Coe (2013), soldiers in battle were the only exception to this exclusivity, as chocolate was considered a stimulant. Chocolate was included in their rations, eaten as pellets or wafers formed from ground cocoa. While mole poblano, a sauce that contains chocolate, is commonly associated with the Aztecs, it originated in territory that was never occupied by them, and the sauce was only invented after the Spanish invasion. It was served to human sacrifice victims before their execution. Grivetti (2008) says chocolate was also served to the sick, to treat ailments including coughs, stomach issues and fever, and anthropologists Martin and Sampeck (2015) say that although chocolate was not consumed in the same way as the elite among commoners during the Postclassical period, it was widely available across Mesoamerica at the time of the conquest for rituals around healing, marriage and travel.

Cacao was imported into central Aztec territory because frost stopped cacao trees from growing there. Most of the beans came from Soconusco, a region the Aztecs had conquered specifically for its cacao. The Aztecs required the conquered inhabitants to pay tribute in cacao. At the time of the Spanish conquest, 1.5 million trees were tended in Soconusco. Cacao was transported across Aztec territory by pochteca, carrying 24,000 beans weighing 50–60 pounds (23–27 kg) on their backs.

Although chocolate was primarily served as a drink, it was sometimes eaten. It was served both hot and cold. A gruel made by adding maize was held to be lower-quality than drinks without. While the highest-quality chocolate was pure, additions were often made, requiring the removal and then replacement of the foam. The most popular addition throughout Mesoamerica was dried and ground chili, though ingredients such as honey, dried and ground vanilla or flowers, and annatto were added. Today, Aztec chocolate drinks are commonly understood to contain cinnamon, despite the spice only being introduced to Mesoamerica by the Spanish conquest. Some Spanish observers claimed that certain chocolate recipes were considered aphrodisiacs, but these reports are not considered reliable. Women were responsible for processing cacao into a beverage.

The Spanish conquistadors recorded the currency value of the cocoa beans, noting in 1545 that thirty beans could buy a small rabbit, one bean could buy a large tomato, and a hundred beans could purchase a turkey hen. Royal stores were claimed to hold massive amounts of cocoa beans. Cocoa beans were often counterfeited, with substitutes including dough made of amaranth, wax or broken avocado pits.

== Introduction to Europe ==
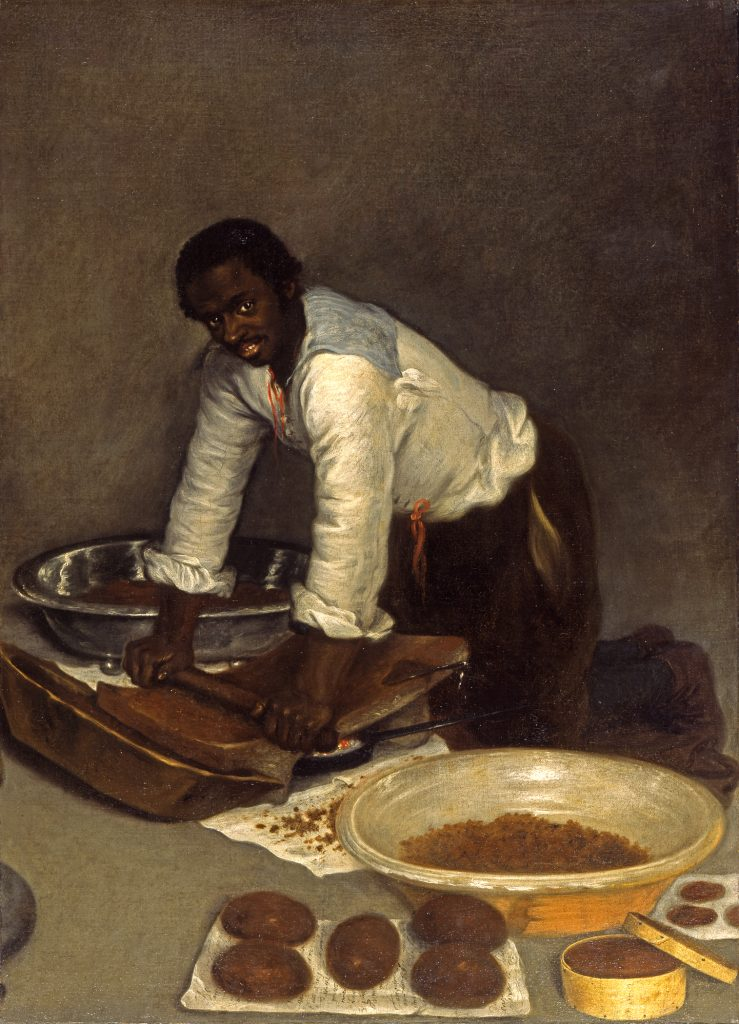
A Man Milling Cacao into Chocolate with a Metate and a Mano, c. 1680–1780 by an unknown Spanish artist

=== European encounters ===
On the fourth voyage of Columbus, on 15 August 1502, the expedition came upon a Mayan trading canoe near an island in the Gulf of Honduras. A member of the Columbus expedition, while documenting the items on the canoe, noted the apparent value of cocoa beans based on the canoe crew's reaction when beans were dropped. However, they did not know what they were, nor that they could be used to make a drink. Spanish conquistador Hernán Cortés may have been the first European to encounter chocolate when he observed it in the court of Moctezuma II in 1520.

By 1524, the Spanish had established control over central Mexico, and expanded cacao production while increasing tribute requirements in "frenzied" efforts to profit from cacao. Cacao was produced using forced labor under the encomienda labor system. During the 16th century Native Americans experienced a massive population decline due to exposure to Eurasian diseases and direct violence from colonizers, and production of cacao decreased. In response, more cacao was produced on the Guayaquil coast of Ecuador, as well as in Venezuela, albeit of a lower quality and using slaves from Africa. This cacao was argued to be inferior as it was not the same variety as the Criollo type grown in Mesoamerica: this was the Forastero, which was native to South America and although it yielded more fruit and was more disease resistant, it tasted dry and bitter. (Note: These traditional divisions of beans into mainly Criollo, Forastero and Trinitario have little genetic basis.) As Guayaquil cacao flooded the Mexican market in the early 1600s, dropping prices, Guatemalan officials among others worked to ban Guayaquil cacao from Guatemalan ports and those of New Spain. Despite bans on importing this cacao around 1630, Guayaquil cacao continued to be exported by smugglers. The Spanish introduced cacao to the Caribbean around 1525, where it spread from Trinidad to Jamaica.

Chocolate was an acquired taste for the Spaniards living in the Americas, widely disliked until the 1590s, and they found the foam particularly objectionable. The primarily male Spanish population was exposed to chocolate through the Aztec women they married or took as concubines. As Spanish women immigrated and the Spanish elite ceased marrying local women, Aztec women remained in households as domestic servants. Spaniards, casta and Afro-Guatemalan women who couldn't afford domestic servants likely learned to make chocolate from their neighbors. To adapt chocolate to Spanish tastes, it was often sweetened, flavored with familiar spices and served warm, the last change an application of the principles of humorism. The foam was created by just beating the liquid with a molinillo (a wooden whisk) rather than by also pouring it from a height. This habit of serving chocolate spiced to mimic the Mesoamerican flavorings had declined by the 18th century. Women almost always prepared chocolate, and only in rare cases did a man prepare it. (Note: Such was the rarity that during the Inquisition in one case a man claimed the fact he prepared the morning chocolate rather than his wife as proof that she was a sorcerer-witch.) During the early colonial period, missionaries sold solid sweet chocolates as delicacies, produced by nuns. These chocolates were very profitable.

=== Spread ===
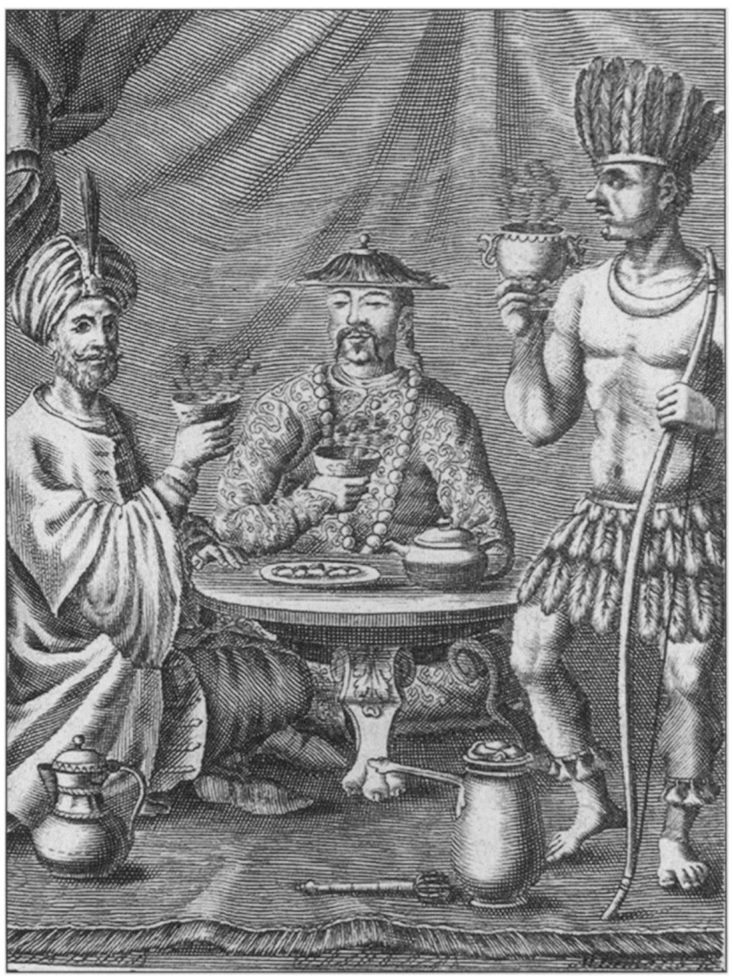
A 17th-century depiction of a Turk, Chinese, and Aztec drinking coffee, tea, and chocolate. Coffee and tea were introduced to Europe around the same time as chocolate.

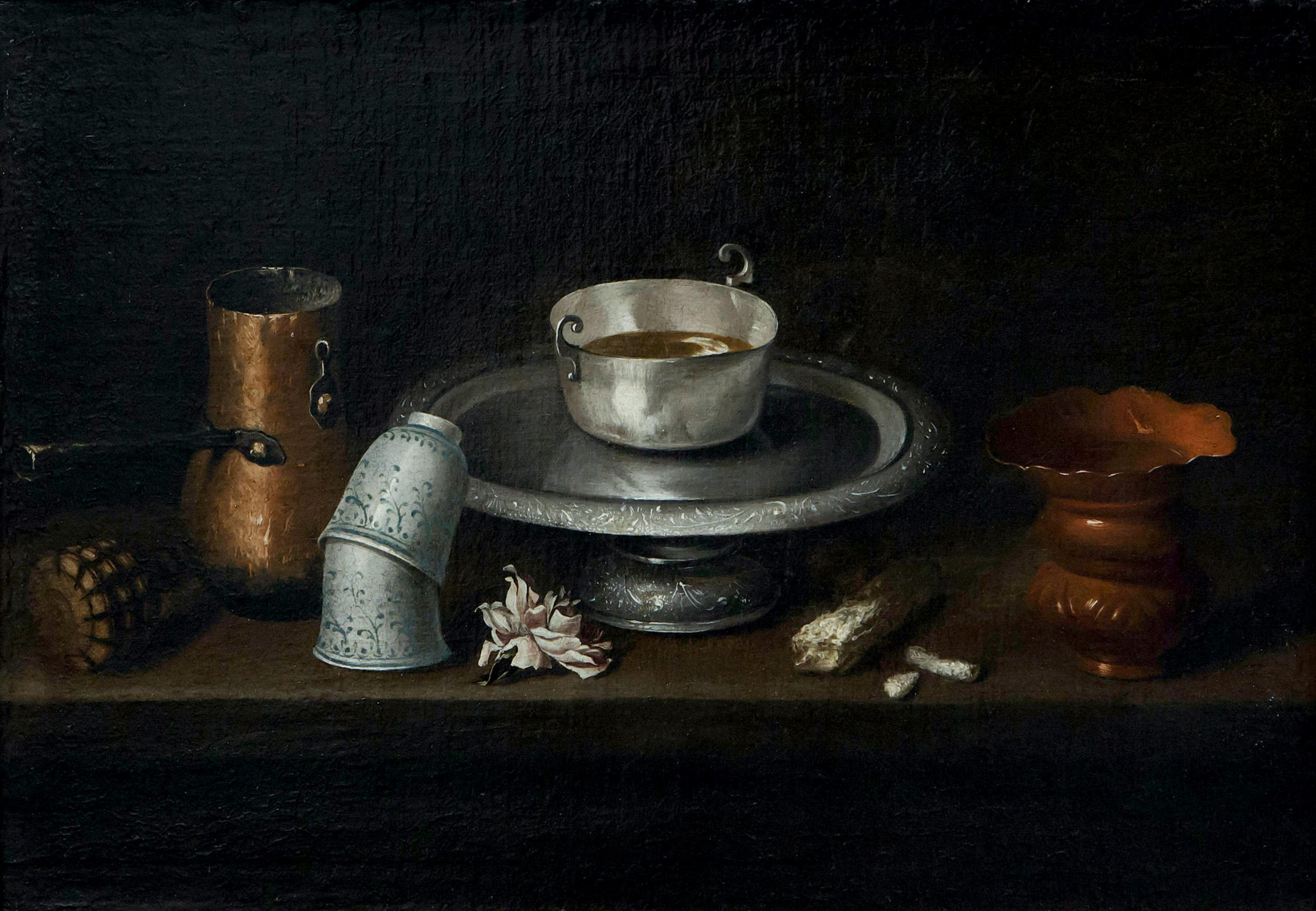
Painting by Juan de Zurbarán, depicting the usual way of serving chocolate – from a cup or a bowl, c. 1640

The exact date when chocolate was brought to Spain is unknown, and there is no evidence Cortés was responsible for its introduction. According to the earliest documented evidence, it was introduced to the Spanish court in 1544 by Qʼeqchiʼ Mayan nobles brought to Spain by Dominican friars, but it was not until 1585 that the first official shipment of cacao to Europe was recorded. Through the 16th century, the Spanish were interested in the medicinal qualities of Mesoamerican plants. Writers such as Bernal Díaz and Francisco Hernández, the royal physician to Philip II of Spain, claimed that chocolate was an aphrodisiac, and Hernández reported to Spain a range of conditions he believed chocolate and its additives could treat. As a result, Spain during this period viewed chocolate primarily as a medicinal substance. By the mid-16th century, chocolate was being manufactured and sold in large quantities. By the 17th century, Madrid had stored around 700,000 pounds of cacao.

From Spain, chocolate spread to other European nations: to Portugal, to Italy in the 17th century, and then outwards. Religious orders played a significant role in its dissemination. Tracing the spread of chocolate in Europe is complicated by the religious wars and shifting allegiances of the time, but it is understood that it was driven by cosmopolitanism and missionaries. During the 17th century, drinking chocolate became very popular among the elite of Europe, and was believed to be an aphrodisiac. It was expensive due to the high transportation costs and import duties. From the late-16th century until the early 18th century, there was controversy about whether chocolate was both a food and a drink or just a drink; this distinction was important for determining if consumption violated ecclesiastical fasts. This dispute continued despite popes including Pope Pius V, Clement VII and Benedict XIV opining it did not break the fast. Most cacao imported to Europe in the 17th–18th centuries came from Venezuela.

With the difficulty in tracing the spread of chocolate across Europe, it is difficult to pinpoint when chocolate was introduced to France. However, evidence suggests it was first introduced as medicine. (Note: The theory most popular with food writers, that chocolate was introduced by the daughter of Philip III of Spain, Anne of Austria with her 1615 marriage to Louis XIII, is unsupported by contemporary documentation.) The silver chocolate pot, used to stir and beat chocolate, was thereafter invented by the French. By the 1670s, drinking chocolate was widespread among French aristocratic women, despite debate over whether chocolate was medically good or bad, and it would only be settled as beneficial by 1684 with the publication of a thesis defending chocolate by a Paris physician. Concerns about the health effects can be seen expressed in a 1671 letter by noblewoman Marie de Rabutin-Chantal: "The Marquise de Coëtlogon took so much chocolate during her pregnancy last year that she produced a small boy as black as the devil, who died."

Chocolate arrived in England from France around 1657, around the same time as tea and coffee, and encountered an initial backlash from those with medical concerns. Cocoa was supplied by Jamaican plantations, after the British conquered the Spanish territory in 1655. While chocolate had begun being flavored with new, highly perfumed ingredients such as jasmine and ambergris in Italy in the 17th century, in England chocolate was a commercial product and production was simpler and less careful. Chocolate was served in coffee houses to whoever could pay, and by the end of the 17th century it was compulsory to include it in British Navy rations. From England, chocolate spread to the North American colonies by the late-17th century. Chocolate was well established among the elite of the late-17th-century Philippines, brought over by the conquering Spanish.

=== Food of the elite ===
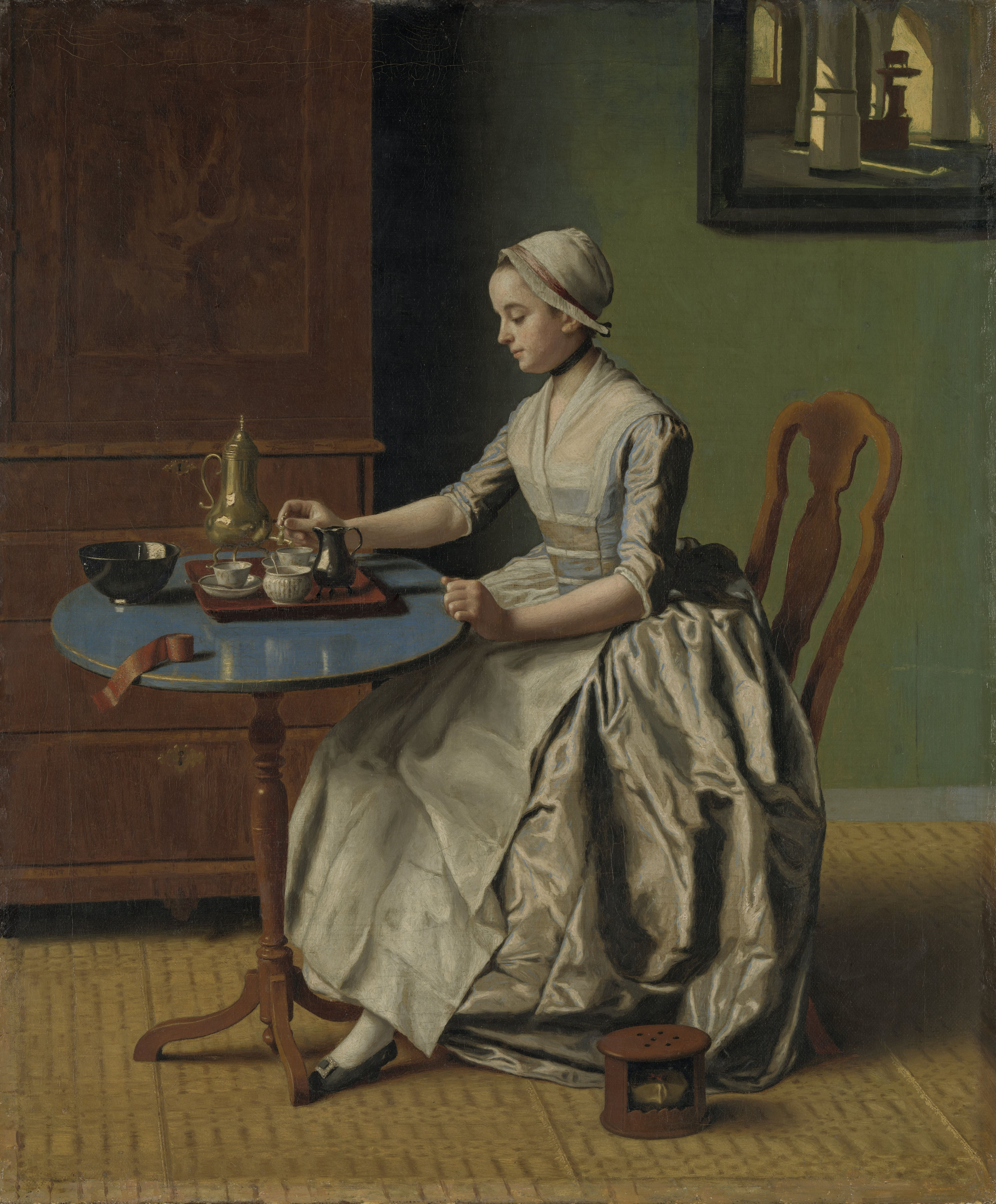
A Lady Pouring Chocolate by Jean-Étienne Liotard (1744)

In the 18th century, chocolate was considered southern European, aristocratic, and Catholic. This was in contrast to bourgeois coffee and proletarian alcohol. Although the technique of producing chocolate was still very similar to that of Native Americans, chocolate was also consumed as bars, pastilles, in ices, desserts, main courses, and pasta. In 1753, Swedish biologist Carl Linnaeus gave cacao its genus name: Theobroma, meaning "food of the gods". Medical opinion of this time held that chocolate was medically beneficial if not consumed in excess.

In Spain, Jesuits were prominent in importing and drinking chocolate until Charles III expelled them in 1767. The upper and middle class consumed chocolate for breakfast and after dinner, after drinking a glass of cold water. Guilds of chocolate grinders formed across cities. Recipes featured egg yolks. In Italy chocolate preparation varied. Following a historic use of conveying poisons, Pope Clement XIV was rumored to have been killed by poison put in his chocolate, after he suppressed the Jesuits. Chocolate was commonly used in savory recipes in Italy during the 18th century, particularly in northern Italy. In France, chocolate was mainly used in desserts and confectionery. The French began heating working areas of the table-mill to assist extraction in 1732. Chocolaterie Lombart was founded in 1760, and is claimed to have been the first chocolate company in France. In Northern Europe, chocolate was made from boiling milk rather than water. In Central America, particularly Mexico, chocolate was still commonly consumed, including by the poor. Consumption habits differed between ethnic groups.

Developments in the technique of producing chocolate began in the 18th century. In 1729, British apothecary Walter Churchman received a patent for a water engine that powered cocoa milling, purchased by Joseph Storrs Fry II of J. S. Fry & Sons in 1789. In the American colonies, water-powered milling began in 1765. In 1776 in France, a hydraulic mill was invented, which spread to other European countries.

== Late modern era ==
=== Popular consumption ===
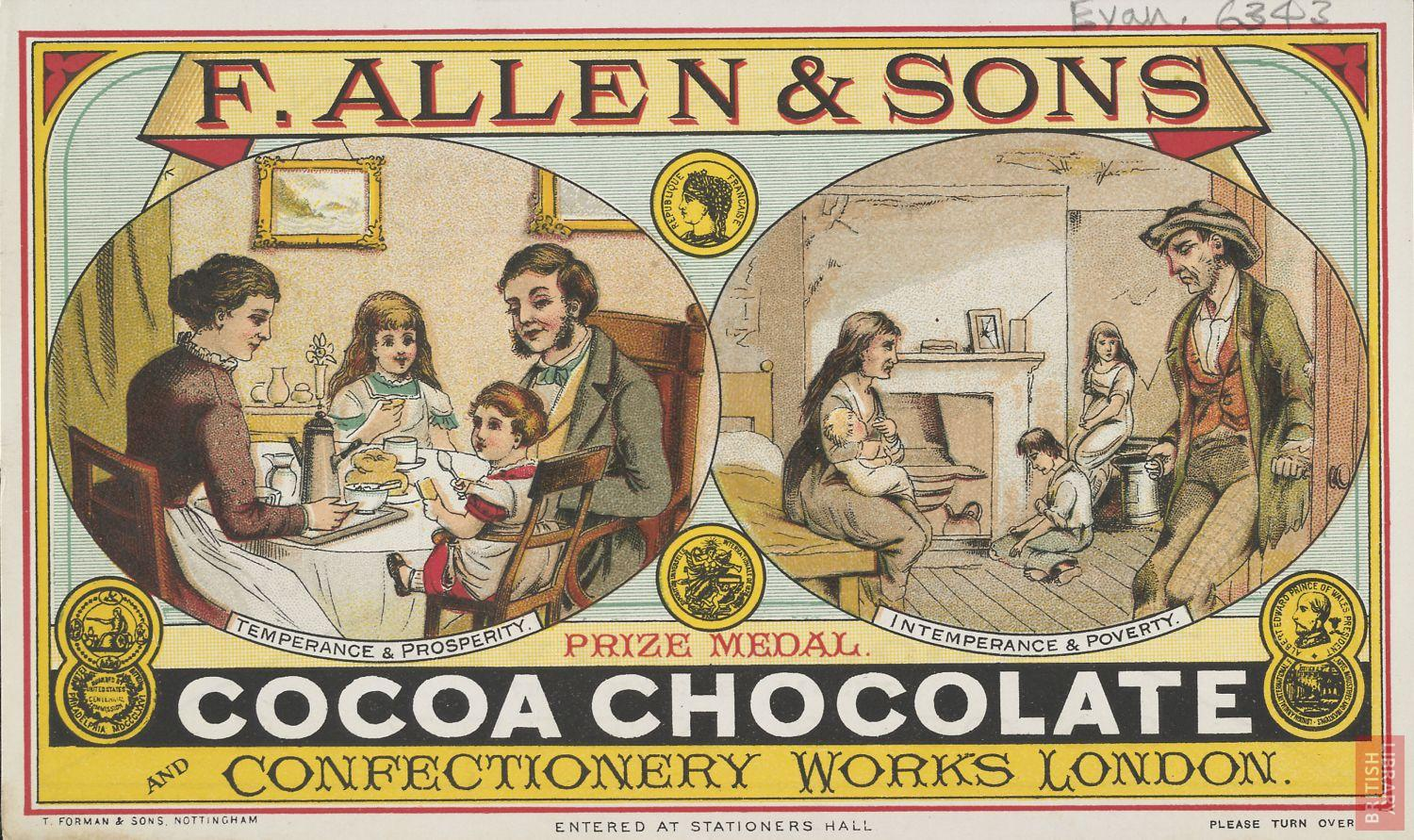
1880 drinking chocolate advertisement

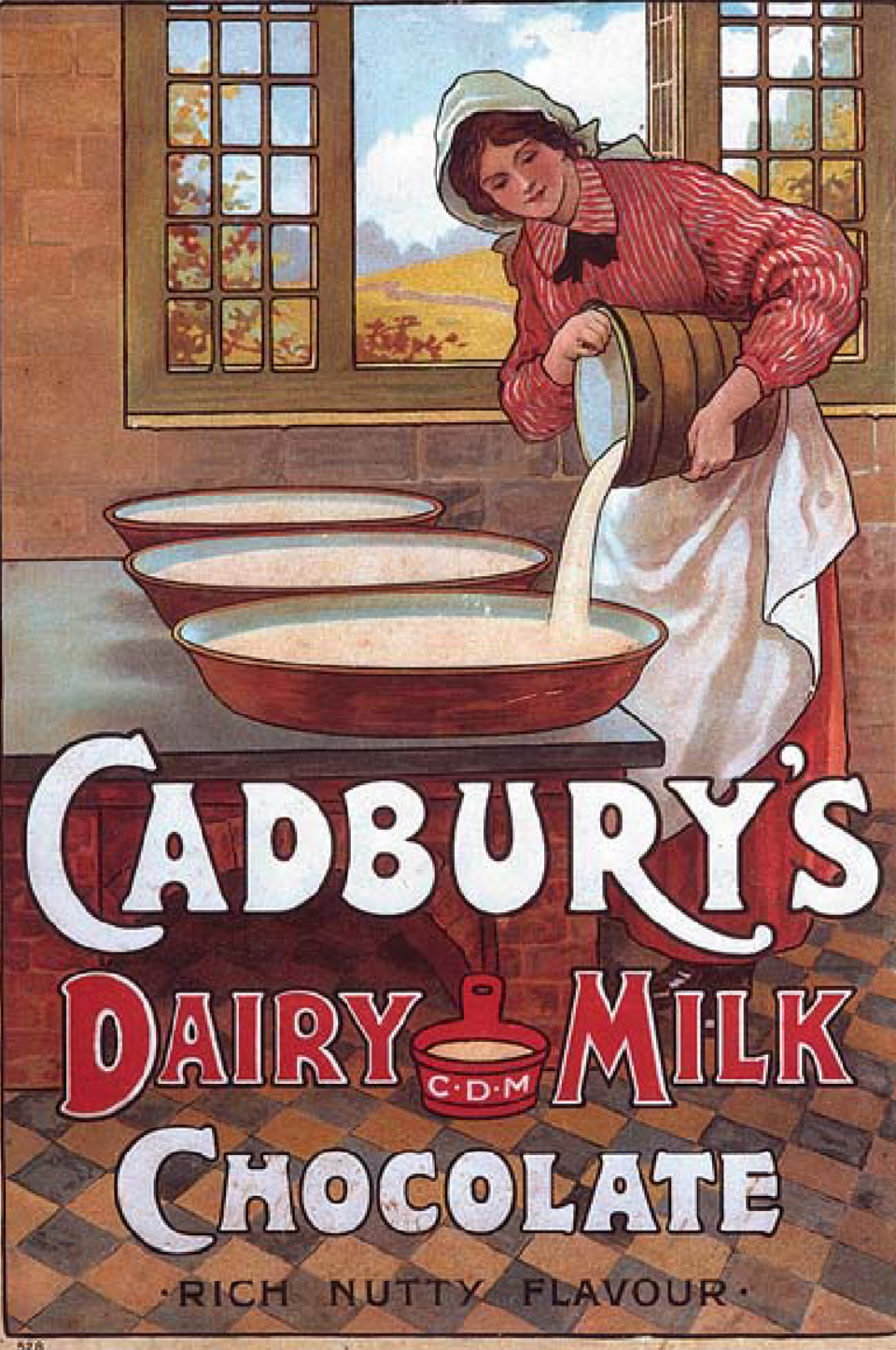
Circa 1905 advertisement for Cadbury Dairy Milk

In 1828, Coenraad Johannes van Houten received a patent for the manufacturing process of making Dutch cocoa. The process removed cocoa butter from chocolate liquor, the result of milling, by enough to create a cake that could be pulverized into a powder. This would later permit large-scale, cheap chocolate production, in powdered and solid forms, opening up mass consumption. (Note: Van Houten was not the first to invent this machine; a machine doing the same thing was depicted in Nicolas de Blégny's 1687 treatise on chocolate, coffee and tea.) At the time, however, there was no market for cocoa butter, and it took until the 1860s to be widely used. Chocolate was often adulterated, including by firms such as Cadbury, which resulted in the creation of food standards laws. Adulterated chocolate replaced cocoa butter with cheaper and more convenient filler, like starches or powdered peas, but could also contain harmful materials like brick or lead.

By the 1830s, sweetened chocolate bars had already become popular in France. French pharmacist Antoine Brutus Menier helped expand chocolate production, launching a chocolate tablet in 1836 and developing the Menier factory in Noisiel. By the 1840s, France produced a wide range of chocolate bars, bonbons, pralines, and creams, while chocolate tablets were commonly sold in different sizes and shapes. By the 1850s, Menier's production had grown significantly, with much of it exported. French chocolate remained dominant in confectionery until milk chocolate emerged in the 1890s. With improvements in production, a worker in 1890 could produce fifty times more chocolate paste than the same worker could before the Industrial Revolution.

Quakers were active in chocolate entrepreneurship in the Industrial Revolution, setting up the firms J. S. Fry & Sons, Cadbury, and Rowntree's. They were teetotalers, and believed chocolate was a good alternative to alcohol. In 1847, Fry’s is credited with the introduction of eating chocolate in Great Britain. At the Great Exhibition of 1851, British confectioners were reported to have begun adopting French-style chocolate-making techniques. A corresponding increase in cocoa butter prices made this, for a time, a food of the elite. Competition between Cadbury and Fry's in the 19th century created the chocolate box and the chocolate Easter egg. Quaker firms built model villages, such as Bournville, to promote worker morality and living conditions. This paternalistic concern was shared by other, irreligious chocolate manufacturers.

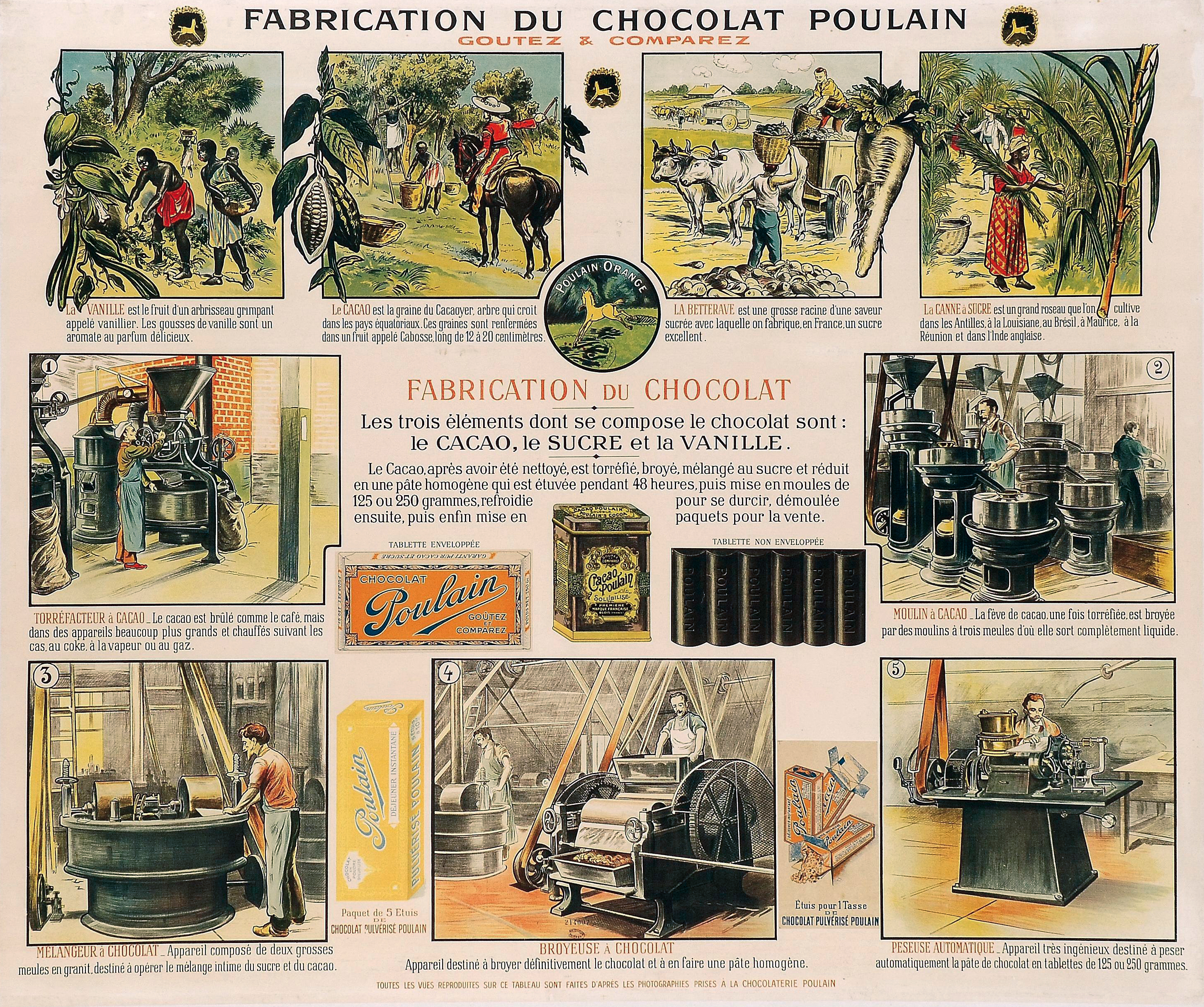
Industrial chocolate-making process before the invention of conching (Chocolat Poulain poster, c. 1900)

In 1819, François-Louis Cailler opened the first chocolate factory in Switzerland, using machinery of his own invention. Philippe Suchard followed in 1826. The Suchard factory featured the first melanger (chocolate mixing machine), and likely helped make chocolate more affordable. Chocolate was more bitter at the time than it is today. In the 1860s, Van Houten's Cocoa alkalized cocoa powder, which improved taste and darkened appearance. Modern milk chocolate was invented in 1875 when Swiss chocolate manufacturer Daniel Peter combined the recently invented powdered milk with chocolate and achieved public acceptance after 1900. Milk had previously been added to chocolate, but it was expensive and difficult to keep fresh. In 1879, the conching process was invented by the Swiss chocolatier Rodolphe Lindt, which heats and agitates liquid chocolate for days to change flavor and increase smoothness. Before Lindt invented conching, chocolate had been gritty. He kept conching as a trade secret for more than 20 years. Able to integrate more smoothly with batters and doughs, conching allowed chocolate to become a more common ingredient in baking.

In the early 19th century, the Portuguese began commercial cacao growing in West Africa after their colonies in South America gained independence. Introducing the crop to São Tomé from Brazil in 1824, widespread cultivation soon spread across Africa. In bringing cacao to Africa from Brazil, the Portuguese also recreated the slave plantation system. When Portugal made slavery illegal in 1869 after large international pressure, production was maintained by creating a captive workforce through "legal trickery". São Tomé and Príncipe became the largest producer in 1905. Although cacao had historically been grown on a mix of estates and smallholdings, by 1914 the latter was becoming dominant.

The price of chocolate began to drop dramatically in the 1890s and 1900s as production of chocolate shifted from the Americas to Asia and Africa. From 1880 to 1914, the mass market for chocolate experienced huge growth: between 1896 and 1909, chocolate consumption in the United States increased 414%, and similarly quadrupled between 1880 and 1902 in England. Eating chocolate overtook drinking chocolate in market share in the early 1900s, but this growth was largely restricted to Western nations.

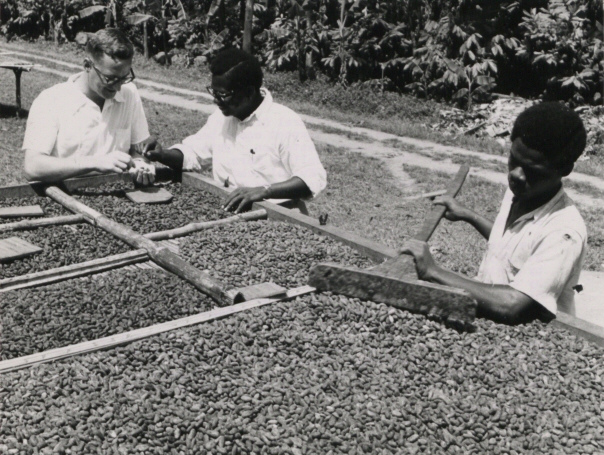
Inspecting cocoa beans in the Gold Coast, in modern-day Ghana in 1957

After receiving the attention of journalists and activists, Cadbury began inquiring into labor practices in the Portuguese cacao industry in the first decade of the 20th century. A 1908 report by Cadbury agent Joseph Burtt described the system as "de facto slavery". In 1909, Fry's, Cadbury, and Rowntree's boycotted plantations in Portuguese territories which generally improved working conditions, although not entirely. Cadbury moved sourcing to the British colony of the Gold Coast, today Ghana, which became the largest producer of cacao in 1911. It remained the largest producer until it was overtaken by the Ivory Coast in 1977. The growth in the West African cocoa industry was driven by a combination of colonial pressures and a European market.

=== Post-WWI ===
Couverture chocolate was invented by Belgian chocolatier Octaaf Callebaut in 1925. Tempering, the process of cooling and heating chocolate to form a crisp break and glossy appearance, was developed by 1931. In 1936, Nestlé first sold white chocolate. Lecithin began to be added after WWII to improve consistency and texture. In 1956, chocolate containing cocoa butter substitutes was launched in Britain. These substitutes, which are cheaper fats with similar properties to cocoa butter, only replace some of the chocolate's cocoa butter. From the 1970s there were arguments over how much cocoa butter could be replaced with these cheaper fats and still be called chocolate, and in 1997, EU regulations ruled this could only be a maximum 5% of chocolate's fat, which was followed by Australia and New Zealand. The US did not allow any substitutions.

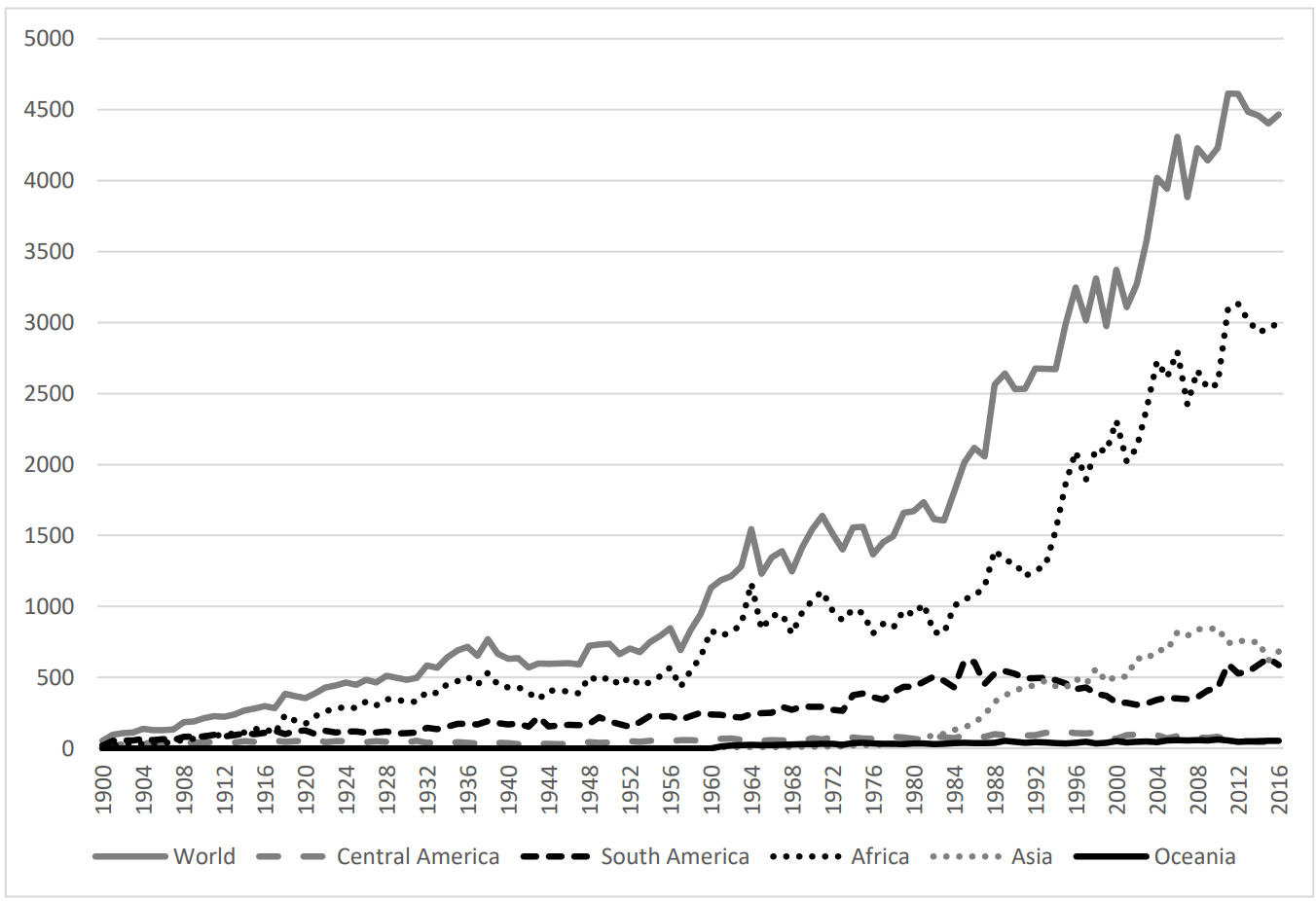
World production of cocoa beans (1900–2016), by region, in tonnes

Through the 20th century, plantations were damaged by disease and climate. Scientists attempted to stop this, by breeding hardier hybrid varieties and cloning the best stock. However, the chocolate that these beans produced was sometimes bitter, and concentrating production in fewer varieties caused problems when they were impacted by disease. The supply chain became more efficient with motor vehicles and the uptake of shipping containers. In the 1980s, Indonesia increased production. From the late 1980s to 2019, cocoa bean production doubled. During this time, governance over production moved from states to market-led initiatives. Markets in China and India emerged in the late 20th century, with chocolate centrally a gift. In both markets, this rise was driven by an increase in investment and household income.

After Cadbury merged with Fry's in 1919, their competition became Swiss chocolatiers and the American firms Mars and The Hershey Company. Godiva introduced Belgian-style chocolate to America in 1966, bringing about a large demand for premium chocolate. Single origin chocolates were first created in 1984, starting the bean-to-bar, or craft chocolate movement. Origin is loosely defined, and can refer to countries or specific plantations. Valrhona introduced single-origin, vintage-dated chocolate in 1998 from a Trinidadian plantation.

== 21st century ==
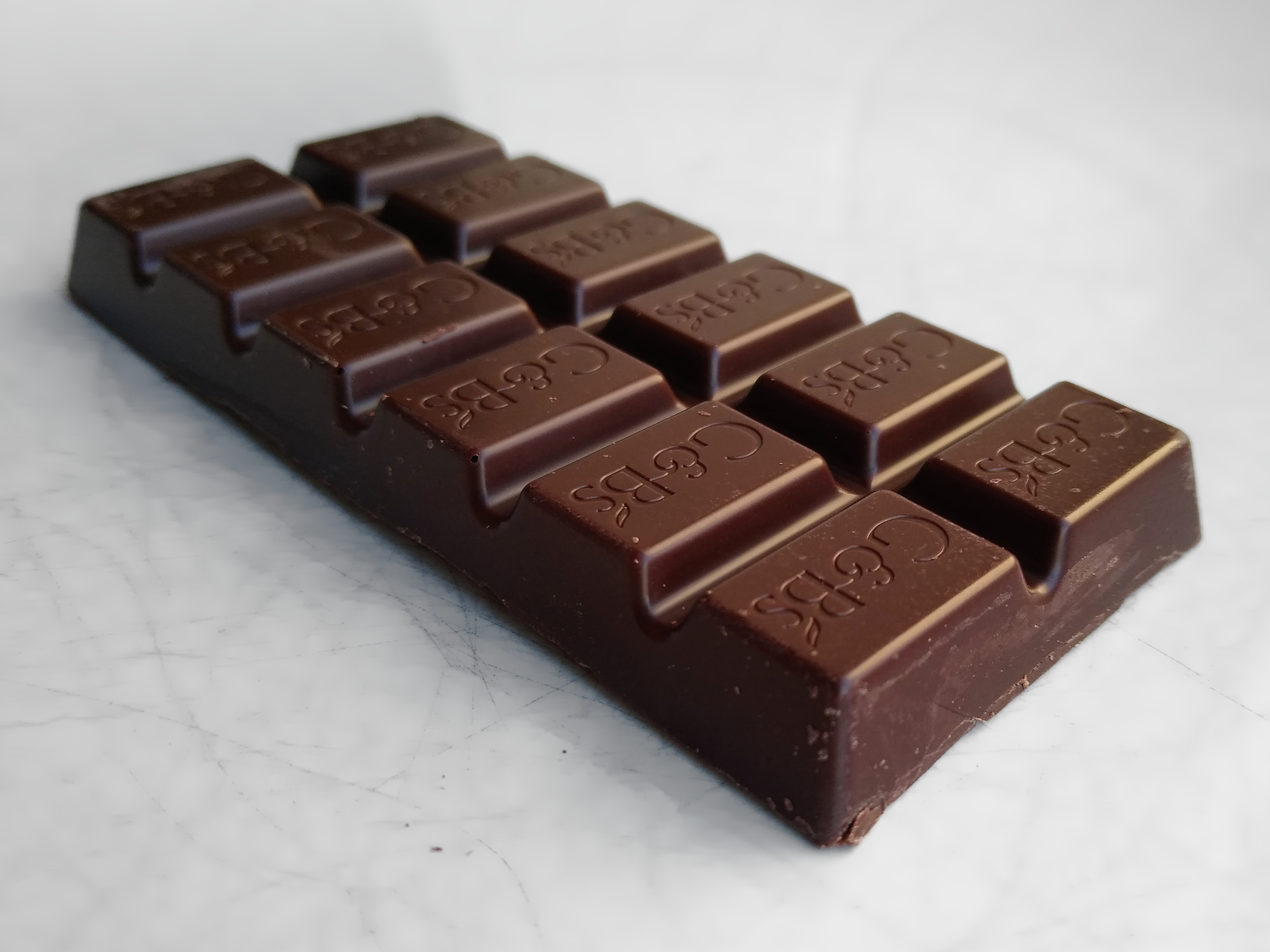
The Green & Black's brand was an early entrant to the organic chocolate market when it was launched in 1991.

As of 2006, drinks were still made from cacao seeds across Mesoamerica, including the beverages bupu and tejate from Oaxaca. In many rural areas of Central America and Mexico, disks of sweetened chocolate were sold at local markets as of 2017. In the 2000s, consumption grew in Africa; in Nigeria, for example, the market grew 775% between 2006 and 2013. Dark chocolate experienced a "popular resurgent interest" by 2009 from public attention around health claims concerning its polyphenolic antioxidants, and raw and organic chocolates were observed to have risen in popularity as of 2018. As of 2010, the bean-to-bar movement was unregulated, and producers' claims of provenance and quality were criticized. Cacao growers and initial processors aim to meet minimum standards. The genetic purity of variants has been contested, as they crosspollinate with other variants. From this ambiguity, growers exaggerate types. In 2013, there were at least 37 bean-to-bar producers in the United States, increasing from one in 1997. Most did not source from West Africa, despite its dominance in cacao production.

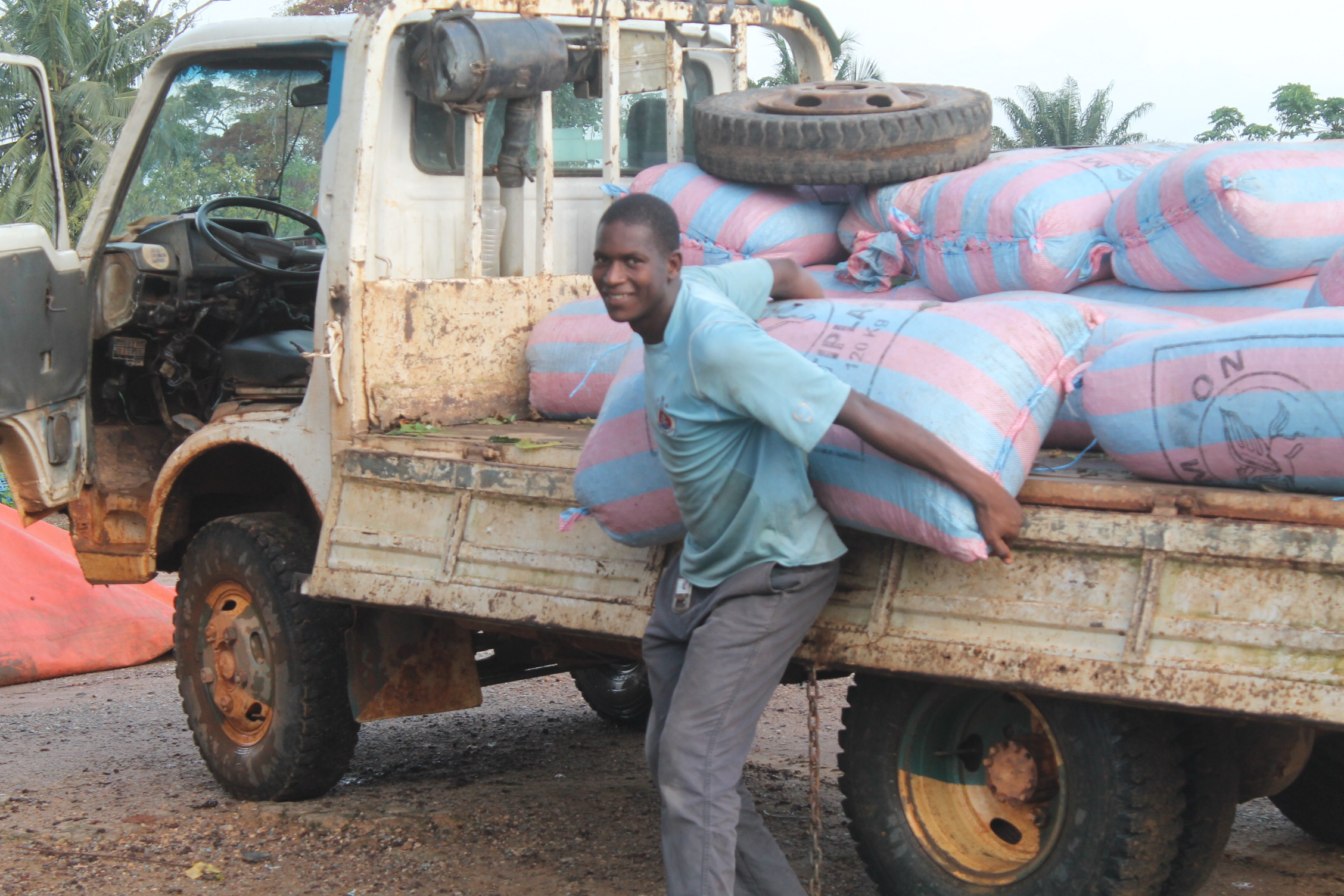
An Ivory Coast worker transporting bags of cocoa beans in 2017

Slave labor among African cacao growers gained public attention after the release of the documentary Slavery: A Global Investigation in 2000. In 2005, a non-binding, voluntary industry agreement called the Harkin–Engel Protocol created by US Congress members was created to address child and forced labor. The media's reporting on this issue is often sensationalistic, and as of 2018, the topic had not been systematically studied. Issues with child labor are not restricted to Africa. Awareness of labor conditions of cacao growers spurred demand for fair trade chocolate.

As of 2019, the cacao industry was under threat by the emergence of diseases; by 2017 up to 38% of cacao harvested annually was lost to disease. As of 2023, the industry's sustainability was threatened by the need for deforesting for more land, poor soil management, persistent poverty and forced labor among cacao farmers, and climate change. As of 2018, there was "little evidence" that initiatives to reduce child labor had been effective. In 2022, Ghana and the Ivory Coast supplied 57% of the world's cocoa.

In 2023, cocoa processors Olam, Cargill, and Barry Callebaut controlled 40% of trade between countries. (Note: Leissle (2018) says these three companies ground nearly two-thirds of all cocoa beans in 2016.) As of 2018, chocolate-makers Mars, Mondelez (owner of Cadbury), Ferrero, Nestlé and Hershey, known as the 'Big Five', comprised almost two-thirds of the global chocolate market. The international trade in chocolate was worth US$108 billion in 2018, and the largest market and consumption per capita remained in the West.

== See also ==
- Food history
- History of coffee
- History of tea
- History of yerba mate

== Sources ==
=== Books ===
- Albright, Barbara (1997). "Trends in Chocolate". In Szogyi, Alex (ed.). Chocolate: Food of the Gods. Connecticut: Greenwood Press. ISBN 978-0-313-30506-1.
- Aguilar-Moreno, Manuel [in French] (2006). "The Good and Evil of Chocolate in Colonial Mexico". In McNeil, Cameron L. (ed.). Chocolate in Mesoamerica: A Cultural History of Cacao. Maya studies. Gainesville: University Press of Florida. ISBN 978-0-8130-2953-5.
- Beckett, Stephen T. (2019). The Science of Chocolate (3rd ed.). London: Royal Society of Chemistry. ISBN 978-1-78801-235-5.
- Clarence-Smith, William Gervase (2000). Cocoa and Chocolate, 1765-1914. New York: Routledge. ISBN 978-1-134-60778-5.
- Coe, Sophie D.; Coe, Michael D. (2013). The True History of Chocolate (3rd ed.). London: Thames & Hudson. ISBN 978-0-500-77093-1.
- Collins, Ross F. (2022). Chocolate: A Cultural Encyclopedia. Santa Barbara, California: ABC-Clio. ISBN 978-1-4408-7607-3.
- Fowler, Mark S; Coutel, Fabien (2017). "Cocoa beans: from tree to factory". In Beckett, Stephen T; Fowler, Mark S; Ziegler, Gregory R (eds.). Beckett's Industrial Chocolate Manufacture and Use (5th ed.). West Sussex, UK: Wiley. ISBN 978-1-11878-014-5.
- Fromm, Ingrid (2016). "From Small Chocolatiers to Multinationals to Sustainable Sourcing: A Historical Review of the Swiss Chocolate Industry". In Squicciarini, Mara P.; Swinnen, Johan (eds.). The Economics of Chocolate. Oxford University Press. ISBN 978-0-19872-644-9.
- Garrone, Maria; Pieters, Hannah; Swinnen, Johan (2016). "From Pralines to Multinationals: The Economic History of Belgian Chocolates". In Squicciarini, Mara P.; Swinnen, Johan (eds.). The Economics of Chocolate. Oxford University Press. ISBN 978-0-19872-644-9.
- Gay, James F. (2008). "Chocolate Production and Uses in 17th and 18th Century North America". In Grivetti, Louis Evan; Shapiro, Howard-Yana (eds.). Chocolate: History, Culture, and Heritage. New Jersey: John Wiley & Sons, Inc. ISBN 978-0-470-41131-5.
- Gordon, Bertram M. (2008a). "Chocolate in France". In Grivetti, Louis Evan; Shapiro, Howard-Yana (eds.). Chocolate: History, Culture, and Heritage. New Jersey: John Wiley & Sons, Inc. ISBN 978-0-470-41131-5.
- Gordon, Bertram M. (2008b). "Commerce, Colonies, and Cacao". In Grivetti, Louis Evan; Shapiro, Howard-Yana (eds.). Chocolate: History, Culture, and Heritage. New Jersey: John Wiley & Sons, Inc. ISBN 978-0-470-41131-5.
- Grivetti, Louis Evan (2008a). "From Bean to Beverage: Historical Chocolate Recipes". In Grivetti, Louis Evan; Shapiro, Howard-Yana (eds.). Chocolate: History, Culture, and Heritage. New Jersey: John Wiley & Sons, Inc. ISBN 978-0-470-41131-5.
- Grivetti, Louis Evan (2008b). "Medicinal Chocolate in New Spain, Western Europe, and North America". In Grivetti, Louis Evan; Shapiro, Howard-Yana (eds.). Chocolate: History, Culture, and Heritage. New Jersey: John Wiley & Sons, Inc. ISBN 978-0-470-41131-5.
- Janssen, Emma; Riera, Olivia (2016). "Too Hot to Handle: The Explosive Growth of Chocolate in India". In Squicciarini, Mara P.; Swinnen, Johan (eds.). The Economics of Chocolate. Oxford University Press. ISBN 978-0-19872-644-9.
- Leissle, Kristy (2018). Cocoa. Cambridge: Polity. ISBN 978-1-50951-320-8.
- Li, Fan; Di, Mo (2016). "The Burgeoning Chocolate Market in China". In Squicciarini, Mara P.; Swinnen, Johan (eds.). The Economics of Chocolate. Oxford University Press. ISBN 978-0-19872-644-9.
- Lopez, Ruth (2002). Chocolate: The Nature of Indulgence. New York: Harry N. Abrams Publishers. ISBN 978-0-81090-403-3.
- Macpherson, Catherine (2008). "Chocolate's Early History in Canada". In Grivetti, Louis Evan; Shapiro, Howard-Yana (eds.). Chocolate: History, Culture, and Heritage. New Jersey: John Wiley & Sons, Inc. ISBN 978-0-470-41131-5.
- McNeil, Cameron L. (2006). "Traditional Cacao Use in Modern Mesoamerica". In McNeil, Cameron L. (ed.). Chocolate in Mesoamerica: A Cultural History of Cacao. Gainesville: University Press of Florida. ISBN 978-0-8130-2953-5.
- MacLeod, Murdo J. (2000). "Cacao". In Kiple, Kenneth F.; Coneè Oyurnelas, Kriemhild (eds.). Cambridge World History of Food. Vol. 1. Cambridge University Press. ISBN 978-0-521-40214-9.
- Momsen, Janet Henshall; Richardson, Pamela (2008a). "Caribbean Cocoa". In Grivetti, Louis Evan; Shapiro, Howard-Yana (eds.). Chocolate: History, Culture, and Heritage. New Jersey: John Wiley & Sons, Inc. ISBN 978-0-470-41131-5.
- Momsen, Janet Henshall; Richardson, Pamela (2008b). "Caribbean Chocolate". In Grivetti, Louis Evan; Shapiro, Howard-Yana (eds.). Chocolate: History, Culture, and Heritage. New Jersey: John Wiley & Sons, Inc. ISBN 978-0-470-41131-5.
- Moss, Sarah; Badenoch, Alexander (2009). Chocolate: A Global History. London: Reaktion Books. ISBN 978-1-86189-524-0.
- Poelmans, Eline; Swinnen, Johan (2016). "A Brief Economic History of Chocolate". In Squicciarini, Mara P.; Swinnen, Johan (eds.). The Economics of Chocolate. Oxford University Press. ISBN 978-0-19-872644-9.
- Pezzarossi, Guido (2017). ""Confites, Melcochas y Otras Golosinas... Muy Dañosas": Sugar, Alcohol, and Biopolitics in Colonial Guatemala". In Schwartzkopf, Stacey; Sampeck, Kathryn E (eds.). Substance and Seduction: Ingested Commodities in Early Modern Mesoamerica. University of Texas Press. doi:10.7560/313862-009. ISBN 978-1-4773-1388-6.
- Presilla, Maricel E. (2001). The New Taste of Chocolate: A Cultural and Natural History of Cacao with Recipes (1st ed.). California: Ten Speed Press. ISBN 978-1-58008-143-6.
- Presilla, Maricel E (2015). "Chocolate, pre-Columbian". In Goldstein, Darra; Mintz, Sidney; Krondl, Michael; Rath, Eric; Mason, Laura; Quinzio, Geraldine; Heinzelmann, Ursula (eds.). The Oxford Companion to Sugar and Sweets. Oxford University Press. ISBN 9780199313396.
- Reents-Budet, Dorie (2006). "The Social Context of Kakaw Drinking among the Ancient Maya". In McNeil, Cameron L. (ed.). Chocolate in Mesoamerica: A Cultural History of Cacao. Gainesville: University Press of Florida. ISBN 978-0-8130-2953-5.
- Sampeck, Kathryn E (April 2019). "Early Modern Landscapes of Chocolate: The Case of Tacuscalco". In DeCorse, Christopher R (ed.). Power, Political Economy, and Historical Landscapes of the Modern World: Interdisciplinary Perspectives. SUNY Press. ISBN 978-1-43847-343-7.
- Prinz, Deborah (2017). On the Chocolate Trail: A Delicious Adventure Connecting Jews, Religions, History, Travel, Rituals and Recipes to the Magic of Cacao. Turner Press. ISBN 978-1683366768.
- Sampeck, Kathryn E; Schwartzkopf, Stacey (2017). "Introduction: Consuming Desires in Mesoamerica". In Schwartzkopf, Stacey; Sampeck, Kathryn E (eds.). Substance and Seduction: Ingested Commodities in Early Modern Mesoamerica. University of Texas Press. ISBN 978-1-4773-1388-6.
- Sampeck, Kathryn E; Thayn, Jonathan (2017). "Translating Tastes: A Cartography of Chocolate Colonialism". In Schwartzkopf, Stacey; Sampeck, Kathryn E (eds.). Substance and Seduction: Ingested Commodities in Early Modern Mesoamerica. University of Texas Press. doi:10.7560/313862-006. ISBN 978-1-4773-1388-6.
- Snyder, Rodney; Olsen, Bradley Foliart; Brindle, Laura Pallas (2008). "From Stone Metates to Steel Mills: The Evolution of Chocolate Manufacturing". In Grivetti, Louis Evan; Shapiro, Howard-Yana (eds.). Chocolate: History, Culture, and Heritage. New Jersey: John Wiley & Sons, Inc. ISBN 978-0-470-41131-5.
- Talbot, Geoff (2017). "Properties of cocoa butter and vegetable fats". In Beckett, Stephen T; Fowler, Mark S; Ziegler, Gregory R (eds.). Beckett's Industrial Chocolate Manufacture and Use (5th ed.). West Sussex, UK: Wiley. ISBN 978-1-11878-014-5.
- Vail, Gabrielle (2008). "Cacao Use in Yucatán Among the Pre-Hispanic Maya". In Grivetti, Louis Evan; Shapiro, Howard-Yana (eds.). Chocolate: History, Culture, and Heritage. New Jersey: John Wiley & Sons, Inc. ISBN 978-0-470-41131-5.
- Walker, Timothy (2008). "Establishing Cacao Plantation Culture in the Atlantic World". In Grivetti, Louis Evan; Shapiro, Howard-Yana (eds.). Chocolate: History, Culture, and Heritage. New Jersey: John Wiley & Sons, Inc. ISBN 978-0-470-41131-5.
- Wilson, Philip K; Hurst, W Jeffrey (2015). Chocolate and Health: Chemistry, Nutrition and Therapy. Cambridge: Royal Society of Chemistry. ISBN 978-1-84973-912-2.
- Wilson, Philip K; Hurst, W Jeffrey (2012). Chocolate as Medicine: A Quest over the Centuries. Cambridge: Royal Society of Chemistry. ISBN 978-1-84973-411-0.

=== Journal and magazine articles ===
- Dakin, Karen; Wichmann, Søren (2000). "Cacao and Chocolate: A Uto-Aztecan perspective". Ancient Mesoamerica. 11 (1): 55–75. doi:10.1017/S0956536100111058. S2CID 162616811.
- Dillinger, Teresa L.; Barriga, Patricia; Escárcega, Sylvia; Jimenez, Martha; Lowe, Diana Salazar; Grivetti, Louis E. (1 August 2000). "Food of the Gods: Cure for Humanity? A Cultural History of the Medicinal and Ritual Use of Chocolate". The Journal of Nutrition. 130 (8): 2057S–2072S. doi:10.1093/jn/130.8.2057S. ISSN 0022-3166. PMID 10917925.
- Edgar, Blake (November–December 2010). "The Power of Chocolate". Archeology. Vol. 63, no. 6. JSTOR 41780626.
- Ganem, Jose Lopez (13 July 2020). "What is Mexican Chocolate?". ReVista. 20 (1).
- Few, Martha (2005). "Chocolate, Sex, and Disorderly Women in Late-Seventeenth and Early-Eighteenth-Century Guatemala". Ethnohistory. 52 (4): 673–687. doi:10.1215/00141801-52-4-673.
- Jones, Geoffrey (1984). "Multinational Chocolate: Cadbury Overseas, 1918–39". Business History. 26: 59–76. doi:10.1080/00076798400000004.
- Kaufman, Terrence; Justeson, John (2007). "Writing the history of the word for cacao in ancient Mesoamerica". Ancient Mesoamerica: 193–237. doi:10.1017/s0956536107000211. S2CID 163097273.
- Lanaud, Claire; Vignes, Hélène; Utge, José; Valette, Gilles; Rhoné, Bénédicte; Garcia Caputi, Mariella; Angarita Nieto, Natalia Sofía; Fouet, Olivier; Gaikwad, Nilesh; Zarrillo, Sonia; Powis, Terry G.; Cyphers, Ann [in Spanish]; Valdez, Francisco; Olivera Nunez, S. Quirino; Speller, Camilla (7 March 2024). "A revisited history of cacao domestication in pre-Columbian times revealed by archaeogenomic approaches". Scientific Reports. 14 (1): 2972. Bibcode:2024NatSR..14.2972L. doi:10.1038/s41598-024-53010-6. ISSN 2045-2322. PMC 10920634. PMID 38453955.
- Leissle, Kristy (Fall 2013). "Invisible West Africa: The Politics of Single Origin Chocolate". Gastronomica. 13 (3): 22–31. doi:10.1525/gfc.2013.13.3.22.
- Leissle, Kristy (20 January 2017). ""Artisan" as Brand: Adding Value In A Craft Chocolate Community". Food, Culture & Society. 20 (1): 37–57. doi:10.1080/15528014.2016.1272201.
- Martin, Carla D; Sampeck, Kathryn E (2015). "The bitter and sweet of chocolate in Europe". Socio.hu Social Science Review. 5 (SI3): 37–60. doi:10.18030/socio.hu.2015en.37. eISSN 2063-0468.
- Marelli, Jean-Phillipe; Guest, David I.; Bailey, Bryan A.; Evans, Harry C.; Brown, Judith K.; Junaid, Muhammad; Barreto, Robert W.; Lisboa, Daniela O.; Puig, Alina S. (August 2019). "Chocolate Under Threat from Old and New Diseases". Phytopathology. 109 (8): 1331–1343. doi:10.1094/PHYTO-12-18-0477-RVW. PMID 31115251.
- Nesto, Bill (Winter 2010). "Discovering Terroir in the World of Chocolate". Gastronomica. 10 (1): 131–135. doi:10.1525/gfc.2010.10.1.131. PMID 21539057.
- McShea, Andy; Leissle, Kristy; Smith, Mark A. (November–December 2009). "The essence of chocolate: a rich, dark, and well-kept secret". Nutrition. 25 (11–12): 1104–1105. doi:10.1016/j.nut.2009.05.012. PMID 19818278.
- Mintz, Sidney W (1996). "The Bromides of Gods, the Passion of Humans". New West Indian Guide. 70 (1/2): 107–112. doi:10.1163/13822373-90002632. JSTOR 41849744.
- Norton, Marcy (April 2004). "Conquests of Chocolate". OAH Magazine of History. 18 (3): 16. doi:10.1093/maghis/18.3.14. JSTOR 25163677.
- Parra-Paitan, Claudia; zu Ermgassen, Erasmus; Meyfroidt, Patrick; Verburg, Peter H. (July 2023). "Large gaps in voluntary sustainability commitments covering the global cocoa trade". Global Environmental Change. 81 102696. Bibcode:2023GEC....8102696P. doi:10.1016/j.gloenvcha.2023.102696. hdl:2078.1/275305.
- Powis, Terry G.; Cyphers, Ann [in Spanish]; Gaikwad, Nilesh W.; Grivetti, Louis; Cheong, Kong (24 May 2011). "Cacao use and the San Lorenzo Olmec". Proceedings of the National Academy of Sciences of the United States of America. 108 (21): 8595–8600. Bibcode:2011PNAS..108.8595P. doi:10.1073/pnas.1100620108. ISSN 0027-8424. PMC 3102397. PMID 21555564.
- Powis, Terry G.; Hurst, W. Jeffrey; Rodríguez, María del Carmen; Ortíz C., Ponciano; Blake, Michael; Cheetham, David; Coe, Michael D.; Hodgson, John G. (December 2007). "Oldest chocolate in the New World". Antiquity. 81 (314). ISSN 0003-598X.
- Sampeck, Kathryn E (2015). "Chronology and Use of Guatemalan Maiolica: Ceramics as Reducción in the Izalcos Region of El Salvador". Historical Archaeology. 49 (2): 18–49. doi:10.1007/BF03377138.
- Swanton, Michael (9 May 2024). "Mesoamerican mantic names as an etymological source of Mixtec vocabulary". Ancient Mesoamerica. 35 (2). Cambridge University Press: 619–644. doi:10.1017/S0956536124000026.
- Swanton, Michael; de Ávila, Alejandro; van Doesburg, Bas (2010). "Comments on Kaufman and Justeson: "The History of the Word for Cacao in Ancient Mesoamerica"". Ancient Mesoamerica. 21 (2): 415–441. doi:10.1017/S0956536111000186.
- Thompson, J. Eric S. (November 1956). "Notes on the Use of Cacao in Middle America". Notes of Middle American Archaeology and Ethnology. 128. Carnegie Institution of Washington: 545–552. JSTOR j.ctt46ntv8.134.
- Zarrillo, Sonia; Gaikwad, Nilesh; Lanaud, Claire; Powis, Terry; Viot, Christopher; Lesur, Isabelle; Fouet, Olivier; Argout, Xavier; Guichoux, Erwan; Salin, Franck; Solorzano, Rey Loor; Bouchez, Olivier; Vignes, Hélène; Severts, Patrick; Hurtado, Julio (29 October 2018). "The use and domestication of Theobroma cacao during the mid-Holocene in the upper Amazon". Nature Ecology & Evolution. 2 (12): 1879–1888. Bibcode:2018NatEE...2.1879Z. doi:10.1038/s41559-018-0697-x. ISSN 2397-334X. PMID 30374172. S2CID 53099825.
