= The 11th Hour (2007 film) =

- Theatrical release poster
- Directed by: Nadia Conners; Leila Conners
- Written by: Nadia Conners; Leonardo DiCaprio; Leila Conners Petersen
- Produced by: Leonardo DiCaprio; Leila Conners Petersen; Chuck Castleberry; Brian Gerber
- Narrated by: Leonardo DiCaprio
- Edited by: Luis Alvarez y Alvarez; Pietro Scalia
- Music by: Jean-Pascal Beintus; Eric Avery
- Production company: Appian Way
- Distributed by: Warner Independent Pictures
- Release dates: May 19, 2007 (Cannes Film Festival); August 17, 2007
- Running time: 92 minutes
- Country: United States
- Language: English
- Box office: $985,207

The 11th Hour is a 2007 documentary film on the state of the natural environment created, produced, co-written and narrated by Leonardo DiCaprio. It was directed by Leila Conners Petersen and Nadia Conners and financed by Adam Lewis and Pierre André Senizergues, and distributed by Warner Independent Pictures.

Its world premiere was at the 2007 60th Annual Cannes Film Festival (May 16–27, 2007) and it was released on August 17, 2007, in the year in which the Fourth Assessment Report of the United Nations global warming panel IPCC was published and about a year after Al Gore's An Inconvenient Truth, another film documentary about global warming.

== Synopsis ==
With contributions from over 50 politicians, scientists, and environmental activists, including former Soviet leader Mikhail Gorbachev, physicist Stephen Hawking, Nobel Prize winner Wangari Maathai, journalist Armand Betscher, and Paul Hawken, the film documents the grave problems facing the planet's life systems. Global warming, deforestation, mass species extinction, and depletion of the oceans' habitats are all addressed. The film's premise is that the future of humanity is in jeopardy.

The film proposes potential solutions to these problems by calling for restorative action by the reshaping and rethinking of global human activity through technology, social responsibility, and conservation.

== Quotes ==
Global warming is not only the number 1 environmental challenge we face today, but one of the most important issues facing all of humanity ... We all have to do our part to raise awareness about global warming and the problems we as a people face in promoting a sustainable environmental future for our planet.

— Leonardo DiCaprio

== People interviewed ==
- Kenny Ausubel
- Thom Hartmann
- Wangari Maathai
- Sandra Postel
- Paul Stamets
- David W. Orr
- Stephen Hawking
- Oren Lyons
- Andrew C. Revkin
- Sylvia Earle
- Paul Hawken
- Janine Benyus
- Stuart Pimm
- Paolo Soleri
- David Suzuki
- James Hillman
- James Parks Morton
- Nathan Gardels
- Wes Jackson
- Joseph Tainter
- Richard Heinberg
- James Woolsey
- Vijay Vaitheeswaran
- Brock Dolman
- Stephen Schneider
- Bill McKibben
- Peter de Menocal
- Sheila Watt-Cloutier
- Ray Anderson
- Tim Carmichael
- Omar Freilla
- Wallace J. Nichols
- Diane Wilson
- Andrew Weil
- Theo Colborn
- Jeremy Jackson
- Tzeporah Berman
- Gloria Flora
- Mikhail Gorbachev
- Thomas Linzey
- Michel Gelobter
- Lester Brown
- Herman Daly
- Betsy Taylor
- Wade Davis
- Jerry Mander
- William McDonough
- Bruce Mau
- John Todd
- Rick Fedrizzi
- Greg Watson
- Leo Gerard
- Mathew Petersen
- Peter Warshall
- Andy Lipkis

== Environmental views ==
Experts interviewed underlined that everyone must become involved to reverse the destruction and climate change. The role of humans in the destruction of the environment is explained from the viewpoint of several different professional fields including environmental scientists, oceanographers, economic historians, and medical specialists. The many experts called upon in this documentary demonstrate a consensus concerning human-caused climate change, and the many other impacts of industrialization such as the dramatic loss of species (biodiversity).

== Critical response ==
In March 2008 The 11th Hour was awarded the Earthwatch Environmental Film Award at National Geographic in Washington, DC.

The film received generally favorable reviews from critics, with a 67% "Fresh" rating on Rotten Tomatoes based on 94 reviews, with an average rating of 6.5/10. The site's critics consensus reads, "Well-researched and swimming in scientific data, this global warming documentary offers some practical and wide-ranging solutions to our climate crisis." It has an average score of 63% on Metacritic based on 30 reviews, indicating "generally favorable reviews".

Kevin Crust, a critic from the Los Angeles Times, rated the film highly:

The [film] asks why these things are happening and apportions blame in varying degrees to governmental indifference tied to its allegiance to a corporate economy that is addicted to growth at any cost and perhaps, most insinuating of all, to the culture of consumerism. Disposable has trumped sustainable in our society, and we're now paying the price. Thankfully for audiences, "11th Hour" is not without hope. The filmmakers save the most exhilarating portion for last when they ask what's being done about the problems. Experts extol existing technologies and projects as attainable solutions. Progressive designs such as a carbon-neutral city and self-sustaining buildings already offer ideas for a new direction. By mimicking nature's own blueprints, it is possible to create a system of living that heals rather than depletes the Earth.

— Kevin Crust,

== See also ==
- Ecological footprint
- Global catastrophic risks
