= Howard-Yana Shapiro =

- Born: 1947 (age 78–79)

Howard-Yana Shapiro is a senior advisor for the Center for International Forestry Research – World Agroforestry (CIFOR-ICRAF) and its initiative Resilient Landscapes and a Senior Fellow in the Plant Sciences department at the University of California, Davis.

He was previously Chief Agricultural Officer of Mars, Incorporated, and a former co-owner of Seeds of Change. At Mars, he encouraged the company's commitment to sustainable sourcing of its cocoa bean supply.

Shapiro has been a Fulbright Scholar, Ford Foundation Fellow, and has won the National Endowment for the Humanities Award. In 2007 he was awarded the Organic Leadership Award by the Organic Trade Association, and in 2009 he was honored with UC Davis' College of Agricultural and Environmental Sciences Award of Distinction.

== Biography ==
Shapiro was born in America in 1947 to Lithuanian and Russian parents. Brought up in New York, Shapiro was a conscientious objector during the Vietnam War. In the 1960s he worked with a number of African-American colleges in the South on earning accreditation. In 1995 Shapiro, his wife Nancy, and others took over Seeds of Change, an organic seed producer and supplier. The company was originally founded in 1989 by Gabriel Howearth and Kenny Ausubel; Shapiro became an investor in 1992 and the company's Director of Agriculture in 1995.

Seeds of Change was sold to Mars Inc. in 1997, in part through its connection with Stephen M. Badger. Shapiro took on the role of Senior Scientist in plant science and agroforestry/agroecology for M&M, Mars. He went on to become Research Manager for plant science in 2000 and Global Director of Plant Science and External Research in 2005.

Shapiro is adjunct professor in the College of Agriculture and Environmental Sciences at the University of California, Davis, and leads the Multi-Disciplinary Research Unit, a collaborative effort between Mars, UC Davis and The University of Nottingham. He also serves on the external advisory board of UC Davis' Agriculture Sustainability Institute.

Shapiro has worked with Google X and other groups on a project to end stunted human growth through better nutrition worldwide, starting in Africa. Through partnerships between University of California, Davis; Mars, Incorporated; and others, he helped to establish the African Plant Breeding Academy in Nairobi in 2013.

In additional to his work, Howard-Yana Shapiro is a collector and rider of motorcycles. His interest began at age 15 when he and a family friend rode up the East Coast to the Arctic Circle and back. He is a member of the 200 Mile Per Hour Club.

== Bibliography ==
He is the author of four books:

- Great Moments in Chocolate History: With 20 Classic Recipes From Around the World (2015)
- Chocolate: History, Culture, and Heritage (2009)
- Gardening for the Future of the Earth (2000)
- Gardencycle: A Gardener's Day Journal (2000)
