= Nina Simons =

- Born: January 10, 1957 (age 69); Manhattan, NY
- Occupations: Organizer and writer
- Known for: Bioneers
- Notable work: Nature, Culture & the Sacred

External videos
- "Nina Simons - Roots and Branches", National Bioneers Conference, November 26, 2018
- "A Woman Listens For Leadership", June 15, 2022

Nina Simons (born January 10, 1957, in Manhattan, NY) is a co-founder & co-CEO of Bioneers, and an organizer of women's leadership retreats and trainings. Her book Nature, Culture & the Sacred: A Woman Listens for Leadership (2018) received the 2018 Nautilus Gold Award in the "Women" category and Silver Award in the "Social Change & Social Justice: category.

== Early life and education ==
Simons grew up in New York City, where she was involved in theater at the New Lincoln School. She majored in theatre, psychology and English at Cornell University.

== Career ==
Simons met her husband, Kenny Ausubel, in Santa Fe, New Mexico. The couple collaborated on and distributed a documentary film about Harry Hoxsey and the politics of cancer treatment, variously titled Hoxsey: Quacks Who Cure Cancer? (1987) and Hoxsey: When Healing Becomes a Crime. The film was referenced in Unconventional Cancer Treatments (1990), a "contract report" prepared by the Office of Technology Assessment (OTA) for the United States Congress.

Simons later joined Ausubel and Gabriel Howearth in their fledgling seed company, Seeds of Change, founded in 1989. Simons eventually became President of Seeds of Change. She left Seeds of Change to become the strategic marketing director for Odwalla, a juice company.

=== Bioneers ===
In 1990, Simons and Ausubel co-founded the Bioneers organization (under the parent organization the Collective Heritage Institute, Inc.) and started a national conference to highlight solutions to many of the world's environmental and social challenges. The idea for the National Bioneers Conference arose from a 1989 meeting with Josh Mailman, a leader in social investment and philanthropy. When Ausubel described various biomimetic innovators and another breakthrough environmental and social solutions, Mailman proposed a conference and offered to help fund it. Simons is now Bioneers' Chief Relationship Strategist.

=== Unreasonable Women for the Earth ===
In the late 1990s, Simons focused on developing women's leadership through a series of retreats. In 2002 her first retreat, called Unreasonable Women for the Earth, brought 34 women leaders together to brainstorm how to initiate a broad progressive women's movement centered around the environment. The name, sparked by comments of Diane Wilson at the 2001 Bioneers Conference, stemmed from the belief that women are often raised to be too 'well behaved,' or 'reasonable,' conditioning which inhibits women from taking a bold stand for what they believe in. The retreat resulted in the formation of CodePink: Women for Peace, a grassroots organization advocating for peace.

=== Cultivating Women's Leadership ===
In 2006, in collaboration with Toby Herzlich and Akaya Windwood of the Rockwood Leadership Institute, Simons co-created a 6-day residential training called Cultivating Women's Leadership. Each gathering is chosen from women applicants who are committed to change-making, have influence in their communities, and are selected to optimize diversity in every way in each cohort (at least 30% and often 40-50% of each cohort are indigenous or women of color).

== Books ==
- Simons, Nina; Campbell, Anneke (2010). Moonrise : the power of women leading from the heart. Rochester, Vt.: Park Street Press. ISBN 978-1-59477-352-5. OCLC 567181937.
- Simons, Nina (2019). Nature, culture and the sacred : a woman listens for leadership. Green Fire Press. ISBN 978-1-7328414-0-6. OCLC 1096397424.

== Awards ==
- 2018, Nautilus Gold Award in the "Women" category and Silver Award in the "Social Change & Social Justice: category for Nature, Culture & the Sacred: A Woman Listens for Leadership
- 2017, Goi Peace Award, with Kenny Ausubel, from The Goi Peace Foundation for “pioneering work to promote nature-inspired innovations for restoring the Earth and our human community.”
- 2007, The Visionary Leadership Award, with Kenny Ausubel, from Rainforest Action Network
- 2006, Green Cross Millennium Award for Community Environmental Leadership, with Kenny Ausubel, from Global Green USA
- 1996, Utne Reader “Visionary” with Kenny Ausubel
