= Ethecon Foundation =

German environmental organisation

- Founded: 2004
- Type: Non-profit NGO
- Purpose: ecology and society
- Location: Düsseldorf, Germany
- Region served: Worldwide
- Method: Advocacy
- Website: Stiftung Ethik & Ökonomie

Ethecon Foundation is a German environmental organisation, which describes itself as a "foundation for ethics and economy". Founded in 2004, Ethecon started presenting annual awards, the Blue Planet Award which is given for actions deemed to be protecting the environment, and conversely the Black Planet Award given to those deemed to be destroying it, in 2006. The foundation has initiated campaigns against Monsanto, Nestlé, Blackwater and TEPCO and has contributed to the construction of a self-governing children's hospital in Fukushima, which commenced operation in 2013.

== Blue Planet Award recipients ==
- 2006 – Diane Wilson, environmental activist
- 2007 – Vandana Shiva, environmental activist
- 2008 – Hugo Chávez, President of Venezuela
- 2009 – Uri Avnery, Israeli peace activist
- 2010 – Elias Bierdel, human-rights activist
- 2011 – Angela Davis, political activist
- 2012 – Jean Ziegler, human-rights activist
- 2013 – Esther Béjarano, Holocaust survivor
- 2014/15 – Tomo Križnar, Slovenian peace activist
- 2016 – Huberto Juárez Núnez, Mexican social activist
- 2017 – Hanna Poddig, german environmental activist
- 2018 – Ann Wright, US peace activist
- 2019 – Rachna Dhingra, Indian human rights activist
- 2020: Phyllis Omido, environmental and human rights activist from Kenya
- 2021: Aminata Dramane Traoré, peace and human rights activist from Mali

== Black Planet Award recipients ==
- 2006 – Monsanto
- 2007 – Peter Brabeck-Letmathe, Chairman of Nestle, and Nestle shareholder Liliane Bettencourt were chosen by the Ethecon Foundation because in their opinion Nestle had engaged in "irresponsible marketing of baby-food, genetic engineering and the monopolizing of water."
- 2008 – Xe Services. The award was delivered in person to Erik Prince, CEO of Xe Services at the time.
- 2009 – Formosa Plastics Group and its CEO, Lee Chih-tsuen. Former Blue Planet winner Diane Wilson travelled to Taiwan to deliver the award in person.
- 2010 - BP for the Deepwater Horizon oil spill
- 2011 – Tokyo Electric Power Company for the Fukushima Daiichi nuclear disaster
- 2012 – Glencore Xstrata along with Ivan Glasenberg (CEO), Simon Murray (Chairman) and Tony Hayward (committee for environment, health and safety)
- 2013 – (the CEO and major shareholders of) Deutsche Bank
- 2014/15 – CEOs Andrew Liveris and James Ringler and major shareholders of Dow Chemical Company
- 2016 – CEOs Muhtar Kent and James Quincey and major shareholders of The Coca-Cola Company, Warren Buffett and Herbert Allen Jr.
- 2017 – CEOs Armin Papperger and Ulrich Grillo and major shareholders of Rheinmetall, Larry Fink (Black Rock) and Paul Manduca
- 2018 – CEOs Herbert Diess and Hans Dieter Pötsch and major shareholders of Volkswagen, Wolfgang Porsche and Stephan Weil
- 2019 – CEO and company founder José Batista Sobrinho as well as major shareholders of worlds biggest meat processing company JBS S.A., Wesley Mendonça Batista and Joesley Mendonça Batista
- 2020: Jeff Bezos, founder of the online retailer Amazon
- 2021: Markus Krebber (Chairman of the Executive Board), Werner Brandt (Chairman of the Supervisory Board), Larry Fink (major shareholder/ BLACKROCK) and Armin Laschet (major shareholder/Minister-President of North Rhine-Westphalia) of the coal and nuclear power company RWE AG (Germany)

== See also ==
- List of environmental awards
