= Bioneer =

Blending of Biomimetics and engineering / pioneering

Bioneer (root: "biological pioneer") is a neologism coined by filmmaker, author and eco-activist Kenny Ausubel. According to Utne Reader, a bioneer is "a biological pioneer, an ecological inventor who's got an elegant and often simple set of solutions for environmental conundrums." As coined by Ausubel, the term describes individuals and groups working in diverse disciplines who have crafted creative solutions to various environmental and socio-cultural problems rooted in shared core values, including whole systems, (anticipatory) thinking, a view of all life as interdependent, and sustainable mutual aid.

The greatest use of the term since its coinage has been in relation to the annual Bioneers conference founded by Ausubel and his wife Nina Simons and held annually in San Rafael, California, and its participants. However, in recent years the term or derivations has seen increasing use independent of the Bioneers organization, suggesting an increasing acceptance of the term in popular usage. For example, a 2005 article on the use and manufacture of biodiesel fuels in northern California was titled "Bioneering Biodiesel." An April 2007 symposium and art exhibition at University of California, Irvine focused on food production, consumption, and distribution was called "Bioneering: Hybrid Investigations of Food."

== Other usage ==
Bioneer and its derivations have also been used in relationship to biotechnology. This usage of the term appears to come from independent coinages based on a portmanteau of "biotechnology" and "engineering" and/or "pioneering". The Cambridge, Massachusetts drug-screening company Bioneering Technologies describes itself as being focused on "the fusion between biotechnology, engineering, and pioneering services (hence, Bioneering)." Students in the Bachelor of Biotechnology Innovation program at Queensland University of Technology in Brisbane, Australia called themselves bioneers "as they regard themselves as pioneering a new era in biotechnology." The Korea-based international biotechnology firm Korea Biotech, Inc., founded in 1992, changed its name in 1996 to Bioneer Corporation. Bioneer A/S is the registered name of a Danish CRO/CDMO offering research and development services to pharma and biotech companies. Bioneer is also a term adopted by those who visit the Biomatrix website for self-improvement. This site and forum advocated the use of bodybuilding, training and technology to improve not only one's muscles (as would a bodybuilder) but also your other physical attributes such as speed, agility and intelligence.

The fictional biotech company Bioneer Research appears in episode 7 season 8 of Quincy M.E., "Science for Sale" (1982), where it is used to illustrate Wall Streets influence on science.

== Difference between usages ==
While Ausubel's coinage does not specifically refer to biotechnology, the second coinage of bioneer referring to biotechnology is clearly antithetical to the term as understood by Ausubel and those influenced by him and the Bioneers organization. In the book Nature's Operating Instructions: The True Biotechnologies (coedited with J. P. Harpignies), Ausubel has made a clear distinction between corporate biotech, including genetic engineering, which he decries, and what he has termed "true biotechnologies" based on biomimicry, natural design, and the restoration of natural capital.
