= Ausubel =

Ausubel is a surname. Notable people with the surname include:

- David Ausubel (1918–2008), American psychologist
- Frederick M. Ausubel, American molecular biologist
- Jesse H. Ausubel, American environmental scientist and program manager
- Kenny Ausubel, American author, investigative journalist and filmmaker
- Nathan Ausubel, American historian, folklorist and humorist
