= Natural design =

The Natural Design Perspective is an approach to psychology and biology that (among other things) holds that concepts such as "motivation", "emotion", "development", "adaptation" refer to objectively observable patterns, rather than hidden causes. It was developed by Nicholas S. Thompson (Professor Emeritus of Ethology and Psychology, Clark University), and has its roots in philosophical behaviorism and the new realism.

Natural Design may also refer to an holistic approach to Design called for by Prof David W. Orr (Professor of Environmental Studies and Politics, Oberlin College USA) and developed for research practice by Prof Seaton Baxter (Emeritus Professor for the Study of Natural Design, Duncan of Jordanstone College of Art and Design, University of Dundee).

== History ==
Darwin intended natural selection to explain the presence of design in nature. However, the term "design" has been out of favor since the watchmaker analogy attacks from William Paley. Thompson believes that is a mistake, because without the concept of design, it is easy for evolutionary theory to become a tautology.

Natural design is design-without-a-designer, in the same sense that natural selection is selection-without-a-selector. Design is a term we use to refer to a matching of form and function, and we can recognize the presence of design independently of the cause of that design:

- A kitchen can become well designed for efficient food preparation due to the actions of a home designer.
- The hand of a blacksmith can becomes well designed for blacksmithing due to processes of muscle growth and callousing.
- The beaks of finches on the Galapagos became well designed to access different types of food through the process of natural selection.

In all those cases, one can identify the matching of form to function, and then look for the processes that explains the presence of that matching.

The field of ethology demonstrated, through decades of experimentation, the same principles that apply to the natural design of physical structures (such as beaks and bones) can apply equally to the design of behavior.

== Studying of behavior ==
Darwinism, psychologist who studies in behavior, stated two consequences of studying behavior.

1. Conceptual consequence of breaking the mind and design. The presence of design was no longer evidence of an intending mind if Darwinism was correct. Therefore, design could exist by itself.
2. Break down of the dualism and the partition that hitherto had existed between psychology and biology. Each discipline now could explain the preferred domain of the other such as instinct and natural selection can be used to human behavior and intentions are able to explain animal behavior.

These two results provided two competing systems for study of behavior and evolved into ethology and further evolved into comparative psychology.

== See also ==
- Teleonomy
