= Ecological literacy =

Ability to understand natural systems and their interactions

Ecological literacy (also referred to as ecoliteracy) is the ability to understand the natural systems that make life on Earth possible. To be ecoliterate means understanding the principles of organization of ecological communities (i.e. ecosystems) and using those principles for creating sustainable human communities. The term was coined by Frank Herbert in his novel Dune - Liet-Kynes's father tells him 'You must cultivate ecological literacy among the people'. It was later developed by American educator David W. Orr and physicist Fritjof Capra in the 1990s – thereby a new value entered education; the "well-being of the earth". Well-being, also known as wellness, prudential value or quality of life, refers to what is intrinsically valuable relative to someone.

An ecologically literate society would be a sustainable society which did not destroy the natural environment on which they depend. Ecological literacy is a powerful concept as it creates a foundation for an integrated approach to environmental problems. Advocates champion eco-literacy as a new educational paradigm emerging around the poles of holism, systems thinking, sustainability, and complexity.

== Overview ==
Ecoliteracy concerns understanding the principles of organisation of ecosystems and their potential application to understanding how to build a sustainable human society. It combines the sciences of systems and ecology in drawing together elements required to foster learning processes toward a deep appreciation of nature and our role in it. Systems thinking is the recognition of the world as an integrated whole rather than a collection of individual elements. Within systems thinking, basic principles of organization become more important than the analysis of various components of the system in isolation. Ecological literacy and systems thinking implies a recognition of the manner in which all phenomena are part of networks that define the way that element functions. Systems thinking is necessary to understand complex interdependence of ecological systems, social systems and other systems on all levels.

According to Fritjof Capra, "In the coming decades, the survival of humanity will depend on our ecological literacy – our ability to understand the basic principles of ecology and to live accordingly. This means that ecoliteracy must become a critical skill for politicians, business leaders, and professionals in all spheres, and should be the most important part of education at all levels – from primary and secondary schools to colleges, universities, and the continuing education and training of professionals." David W. Orr has stated that the goal of ecological literacy is "built on the recognition that the disorder of ecosystems reflects a prior disorder of mind, making it a central concern to those institutions that purport to improve minds. In other words, the ecological crisis is in every way a crisis of education.... All education is environmental education… by what is included or excluded we teach the young that they are part of or apart from the natural world." He also emphasizes that ecoliteracy does not only require mastery of subject matter, but the creation of meaningful connections between head, hands, and heart as well.

Others have reiterated the urgent importance of ecological literacy in today's world, where young people are faced with escalating environmental challenges, including climate change, depletion of resources, and environmentally linked illnesses.

Recent studies have highlighted the importance of higher education institutions in advancing ecological literacy through sustainability education. A 2024 study discovered that universities are crucial drivers in integrating sustainability into curriculum, research, and campus operations, emphasizing on the idea that sustainability education cultivates values, critical thinking, and interdisciplinary collaboration essential for solving complex ecological problems.

The framework for ecological literacy is based on how the knowledge of the environment is necessary for informed decision-making. The more recent framework of ecological literacy also emphasizes ecological thinking, cognitive thinking, and particularly scientific inquiry. An ecologically literate person knows and understands the reality of the environment by precisely identifying its cause-and-effect relationship.

This generation will require leaders and citizens who can think ecologically, understand the interconnectedness of human and natural systems, and have the will, ability, and courage to act

— Michael K. Stone

With an understanding of ecological literacy, perceptions naturally shift. The need to protect the ecosystems is not simply a belief held by environmentalists; it is a biological imperative for survival over the time. This value will become a basic principle for prioritizing thought and action in a sustainable society. In the face of the increasing capacity of industrial systems to destroy habitats and the climate system, the explicit declaration of the principles of ecological literacy – and the resulting awareness of the importance of living within the ecological carrying capacity of the earth, is increasingly necessary. Whether ecoliteracy can address the infamous value-action gap is unclear.

== See also ==
- Ecopolitics
