= Diane Wilson =

American activist and author (born 1948)

- Born: October 17, 1948 (age 77)
- Occupations: Activist, author
- Organization: Code Pink
- Awards: Goldman Environmental Prize
- Website: dianewilsonactivist.org

Diane Wilson (born October 17, 1948) is an American environmental activist, an anti-war activist, and an author. She is known for her work protecting her local environment from pollution by Formosa Plastics.

== Activism ==
In 1989, she was a shrimp boat captain in Calhoun County, Texas, and she saw an Associated Press article saying that the county had the most toxic waste disposal of all counties in America. Texas produces the most chemical waste than any other state in the United States, with the majority of the pollution concentrated on the state's Gulf Coast. Wilson began a campaign against Formosa Plastics, a Taiwanese chemical company then building a PVC (polyvinyl chloride) facility near her town, with tactics including several hunger strikes and sinking her own boat to draw attention to the matter. In 1994 she won "zero discharge" agreements (meaning no liquid effluent discharge into the environment) from Formosa and Alcoa.

Wilson has also protested at meetings concerning the BP oil spill, as well as protesting in support of victims of the 1984 Bhopal, India, Union Carbide gas leak.

She is a co-founder of the anti-war organization CODEPINK. and the co-founder of Texas Jail Project, a grassroots advocacy organization founded in response to Diane's experiences during her five month incarceration in 2005 in Victoria county jail, Texas.

In 2013, Wilson participated in the movement to close Guantanamo Bay, calling for Obama to release the prisoners that had been declared for release, give the men a fair trial, and end indefinite detention. Most notably, she stood in solidarity with the hunger strikers by fasting on salt and water for 58 days. Her fast ended on June 26, 2013 on International Day in Support of Victims of Torture after jumping the White House fence at a Close Guantanamo protest (with groups including Amnesty International, CODEPINK, Veterans for Peace, and Witness Against Torture) in an attempt to deliver a letter to President Barack Obama. Wilson was charged with unlawful entry and handed over to local authorities.

In 2019, she was a plaintiff to a suit, Waterkeeper v. Formosa, against Formosa Plastics for violations of the Clean Water Act resulting in discharges of pollution along the Texas coast. Along with other volunteers, she collected millions of nurdles that served as evidence in the case. The suit was settled for $50 million in October 2019.

== Selected awards ==
In 2005 a documentary was made about her, titled Texas Gold. It won several awards, including "Best Documentary" at the New York City Short Film Festival.

She has received the "Hellraiser of the Month" award from Mother Jones magazine, and a number of other awards, including the Giraffe Project and the Bioneers Award.

In 2006, she was honored with the Blue Planet Award from Ethecon Foundation, one of the comparatively very few 'grass-root' foundations for "more than 20 years of commitment to environmental issues, even putting her life at risk."

In 2023, Wilson was awarded the Goldman Environmental Prize for North America.

== Books ==
- 2005: Nobody Particular: One Woman's Fight to Save The Bays by Molly Bang (ISBN 978-1931498944)
- 2006: An Unreasonable Woman: A True Story of Shrimpers, Politicos, Polluters and the Fight for Seadrift, Texas by Diane Wilson (ISBN 978-1-931498-88-3)
- 2008: Holy Roller: Growing Up in the Church of Knock Down, Drag Out; or, How I Quit Loving a Blue-Eyed Jesus by Diane Wilson (ISBN 978-1933392820)
- 2011: Diary of an Eco-Outlaw: An Unreasonable Woman Breaks the Law for Mother Earth by Diane Wilson (ISBN 978-1603582155)
