= Bioneers =

Non-profit organization

- Collective Heritage Institute
- Formation: 1990
- Founders: Kenny Ausubel and Nina Simons
- Type: Non-profit
- Legal status: Active
- Headquarters: Santa Fe, New Mexico (registered)
- Location: Berkeley, California (conference home)
- Region served: Global
- Official language: English
- CEO: Kenny Ausubel
- President: Teo Grossman
- Website: bioneers.org
- Remarks: Known for the annual National Bioneers Conference.

Bioneers, under its parent foundation, Collective Heritage Institute, is a non-profit environmental and social justice advocacy organization based in New Mexico and California. Founded in 1990, the organization's philosophy says that there is value and wisdom in the natural world, emphasizing that responses to problems must be in harmony with the design of natural systems. Official Programs include Moonrise Women's Leadership, Restorative Food Systems, Indigeneity (Indigenous Forums), Education for Action, and the award-winning Dreaming New Mexico community resilience program.

Bioneers produces media covering subjects such as environmentalism, rights of nature, social justice, sustainability and permaculture. Bioneers Radio is broadcast on local radio stations across the U.S., as well as having segments featured on national NPR stations.

Bioneers also organizes the annual National Bioneers Conference, covering topics such as climate change, social justice and sustainability. Conference presenters have included Michael Pollan, Andrew Weil, Gloria Steinem, Jane Goodall, Philippe Cousteau, Eve Ensler, Bill McKibben, Paul Hawken, and more. Plenary (Keynote) sessions from the national conference are also webcast to Beaming Bioneers satellite conferences held simultaneously in various locations throughout the United States and Canada.

== Origin of name ==
Bioneer (a portmanteau of "biological pioneer") is a neologism coined by founder Kenny Ausubel. It describes individuals and groups working in diverse disciplines who have crafted creative solutions to various environmental and socio-cultural problems rooted in shared core values, including whole systems, (anticipatory) thinking, a view of all life as interdependent, and sustainable mutual aid.

== Annual conference ==
The first National Bioneers Conference, organized by Co-founders Kenny Ausubel and Nina Simons, took place in 1990. For many years, the conference was held annually in the fall in San Rafael, California. In 2023, the Bioneers conference moved to Berkeley, California.

The 37th Bioneers Conference in 2026, will be held in Berkeley, California, March 26th to March 28th.

The national conference brings together a wide array of scientific and social innovators. Conference speakers come from interdisciplinary fields: environmental and socio-political activism; green-biology, chemistry, design, architecture and urban planning; organic and beyond organic farming and gardening; indigenous perspectives; biodiversity, bioremediation, and wildland preservation; alternative energy; engaged spirituality, literature and the arts; holistic and ecological medicine; ethnobotany; socially responsible entrepreneurship, business and philanthropy; the environmental justice, women's and youth movements, independent media, etc.

In many cases, the technological or social solutions to problems showcased are founded on emulation of natural self-organizing systems.

== See also ==
- Andy Lipkis
- Ecovillage
- Michael Pollan
- Neologisms
- Oceanographers
- Water Keeper
- Wild Green
