= Werner Brandt =

German manager

- Born: January 3, 1954 (age 72); Herne, Germany
- Education: University of Erlangen–Nuremberg, Technische Universität Darmstadt
- Occupation: Chairman of the supervisory board ProSiebenSat.1 Media

Werner Brandt (born January 3, 1954, in Herne) is a German manager.

== Education ==
Brandt studied business administration at the University of Erlangen-Nuremberg from 1976 to 1981, and received his doctorate from the TU Darmstadt in 1991.

== Career ==
Brandt started his professional career at PriceWaterhouse in Stuttgart, where he was employed from 1981 to 1992. He then served as a member of the executive board of Baxter Deutschland GmbH for seven years before becoming CFO and labor director of Fresenius Medical Care AG, where he served for two years. From February 2001 to 30 June 2014, he was CFO of SAP AG.

In September 2009, he succeeded his former SAP board colleague, Claus E. Heinrich, as a member of the board of the association “Zukunft Metropolregion Rhein-Neckar”(Future Metropolregion Rhein-Neckar) (ZMRN e.V.).

Brandt is a member of the supervisory boards of Deutsche Lufthansa AG and Qiagen N.V. On 27 February 2013, RWE AG announced that the supervisory board decided to propose Brandt for election to the supervisory board at the upcoming annual general meeting. Since 26 June 2014, he has been Chairman of the supervisory board of ProSiebenSat.1 Media AG and, since the conversion in 2016, ProSiebenSat.1 Media SE.

== Industrial positions ==
At a conference on the future of employee ownership, which took place in Frankfurt am Main in November 2013, Brandt criticized, that the existing tax allowances in Germany, with only 360 Euro, are too low in international comparison. He pleaded for the British model with allowances that would equal around 3,500 Euro.

Brandt predicted that without a change in the tax environment in Germany the size of employee ownership would not increase, which is currently less than 1% for many companies.

== Other activities ==
=== Corporate boards ===
- Commerzbank, Member of the Central Advisory Board
- innogy SE, Member and Chairman of the Supervisory Board (–2017)

=== Non-profit organizations ===
- IFRS Foundation, Member of the Advisory Board (since 2015)
- "Zukunft Metropolregion Rhein-Neckar", Member of the Board
