= David W. Orr =

American academic (born 1944)

David Orr
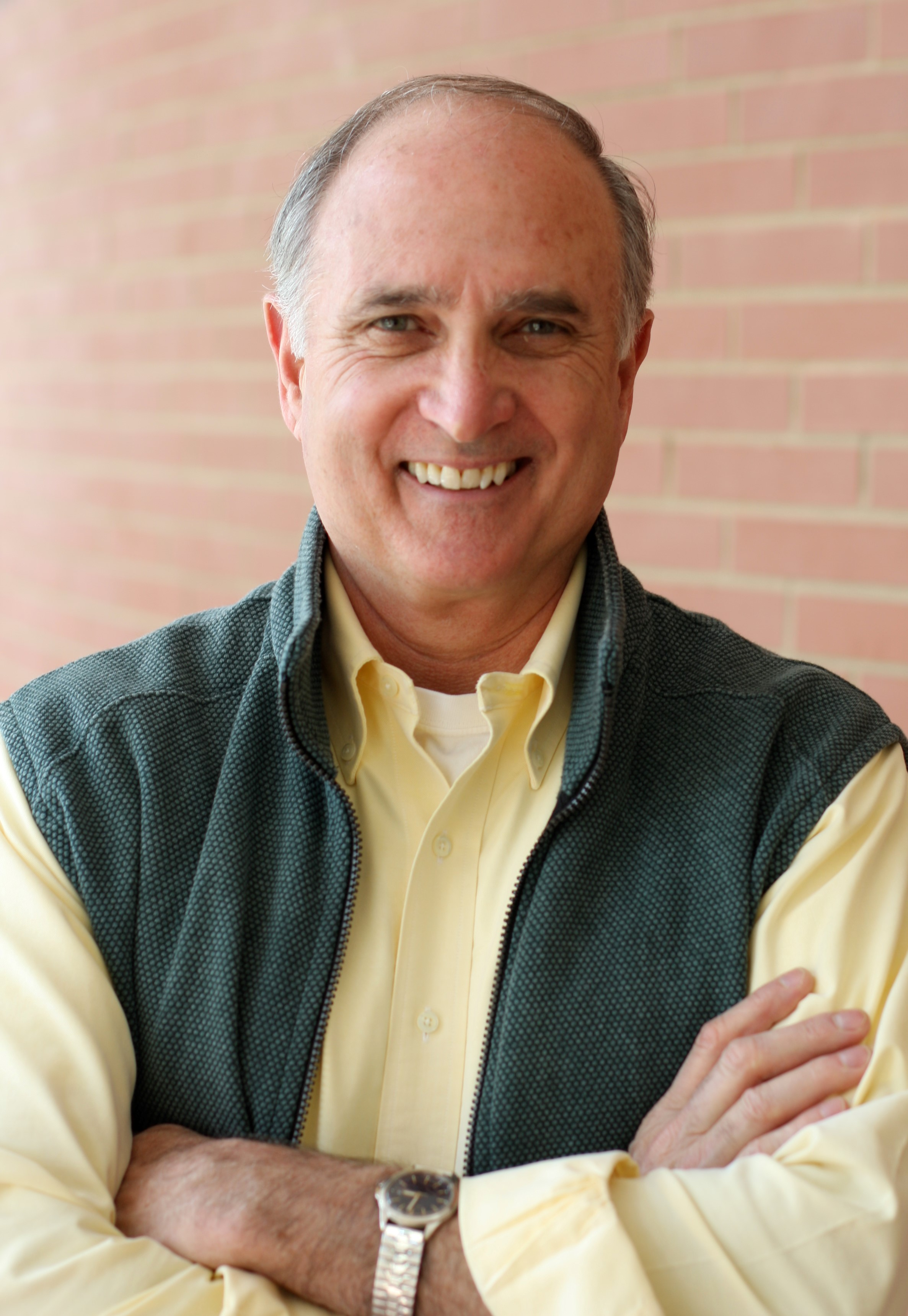
- Orr in 2010
- Born: 1944 (age 80–81) Des Moines, Iowa, U.S.
- Occupation: Professor, writer, speaker, academic, activist
- Education: Westminster College (B.A; History, 1965), Michigan State (M.A; History, 1966), University of Pennsylvania (Ph.D.; International Relations, 1973)

David W. Orr is the Paul Sears Distinguished Professor of Environmental Studies and Politics Emeritus at Oberlin College, and presently Professor of Practice at Arizona State University.

During his tenure at the Environmental Studies Center at Oberlin College, Orr demonstrated how institutions of higher learning can teach ecological literacy while practicing sustainable design and encouraging more eco-friendly lifestyles on campus. Orr's books, Ecological Literacy: Education and the Transition to a Postmodern World (1992) and Earth in Mind (1994-2004), proposed ways in which education should evolve to emphasize sustainability, not only in the narrow parameters of ecology-based programs, but in wider curricula, from political science and economics to liberal arts.

== Early career ==
From 1971 to 1976, Orr was an associate professor of political science at Agnes Scott College in Decatur, Georgia, where he co-founded the annual Atlanta Environmental Symposium. Influenced by the book The Limits to Growth (1972), the Symposia in 1973 and 1974 focused on the limits to growth and land-use in the Atlanta region. These were among the first such regional-wide events to bring media, government agencies, business, community, students and experts to discuss the practical and political implications of earth's limits.

From 1976 to 1979, Orr was assistant professor of political science at the University of North Carolina in Chapel Hill, NC. He published articles in The Journal of Politics, Polity, the Western Political Quarterly, the International Studies Quarterly, Human Ecology, the Sierra Club Magazine, Dissent, and co-edited and contributed to The Global Predicament (University of North Carolina Press, 1979) that helped make the case for including environmental issues to the core of Political Science.

== Oberlin College ==
In 1996, he organized the construction of the Adam Joseph Lewis Center for Environmental Studies at Oberlin College.

He was awarded a Lyndhurst Prize by the Lyndhurst Foundation in 1992, a National Conservation Achievement Award by the National Wildlife Federation in 1993, the Benton Box Award from Clemson University in 1995 for his work in Environmental Education, and a Bioneers Award in 2002.

== Books published ==
- Dangerous Years: Climate Change, the Long Emergency, and the Way Forward Publisher: Yale University Press (November 22, 2016) ISBN 9780300222814
- Hope Is an Imperative: The Essential David Orr Publisher: Island Press (December 1, 2011) ISBN 1-59726-700-7
- Down to the Wire: Confronting Climate Collapse Publisher: Oxford University Press (September 2009) ISBN 0-19-539353-8
- Design on the Edge: The Making of a High-Performance Building (Cooperative Information System) Publisher: The MIT Press (April 30, 2008) ISBN 0-262-65112-2
- Ecological Literacy: Educating Our Children for a Sustainable World (The Bioneers Series). Publisher: Sierra Club Books; (October 1, 2005) ISBN 1-57805-153-3
- The Nature of Design: Ecology, Culture, and Human Intention. Publisher: Oxford University Press, USA; (October 14, 2004) ISBN 0-19-517368-6
- Earth in Mind: On Education, Environment, and the Human Prospect. Publisher: Island Press; (July 30, 2004) ISBN 1-55963-495-2
- The Last Refuge: Patriotism, Politics, and the Environment in an Age of Terror. Publisher: Island Press; (March 15, 2004) ISBN 1-55963-528-2
- Ecological Literacy: Education and the Transition to a Postmodern World (Suny Series in Constructive Postmodern Thought). Publisher: State University of New York Press (January 1992) ISBN 0-7914-0874-4
