= Johan Swinnen (economist) =

Belgian economist

Johan "Jo" Swinnen (born 1962) is a Belgian economist, who is the Director General of the International Food Policy Research Institute (IFPRI), and Managing Director of the Systems Transformation Science Group of CGIAR.

He is known for his work on agricultural and food policy, political economy, institutional reforms, trade, and global value chains within the context of international development.

== Education ==
Swinnen earned his doctoral degree in agricultural economics from Cornell University in 1992. His master's and bachelor's degrees are from KU Leuven.

== Career ==
In 1992, he became senior economist at the Leuven Institute for Central and East European Studies. In 1993, he joined KU Leuven, first as an assistant professor and later an associate professor in agricultural economics and food policy. He joined the European Commission (DG Economics and Finance) in 1998 as an economic advisor, working on preparations for the accession of 10 Eastern European countries to the European Union. He returned to academia in 2002 as a professor of economics at KU Leuven. From 2003 to 2004, Swinnen was a lead economist at the World Bank.

From 2004 until 2019, Swinnen was a professor of economics and the director of the LICOS Centre for Institutions and Economic Performance at KU Leuven. During this period, he was also a senior research fellow at the Centre for European Policy Studies in Brussels.

In 2020, Swinnen was appointed as Director General of IFPRI. In July 2021, he also became the Managing Director of the Systems Transformation Science Group of CGIAR.

Over the years, Swinnen has been a visiting professor at various universities, including at Stanford University's Center on Food Security and the Environment, Göttingen University, and Wageningen University & Research. He served as an advisor to many international institutions, such as the World Bank, the European Bank for Reconstruction and Development, the Organisation for Economic Co-operation and Development, and the Food and Agriculture Organization of the United Nations.

Swinnen has led and served on many professional committees and activities including serving as president of the International Association of Agricultural Economists (IAAE) from 2012 to 2015. From 2020 to 2023, he served as a commissioner on the Food Systems Economics Commission.

== Publications ==
Swinnen has published numerous articles and 30 books. His body of work has been widely cited and has received several awards. His books include:

Swinnen has published numerous articles and 30 books. His body of work has been widely cited and received several awards. His books include:

- Resnick, D., and J. Swinnen. 2023. The Political Economy of Food System Transformation: Pathways to Progress in a Polarized World. Oxford, United Kingdom: Oxford University Press. https://doi.org/10.1093/oso/9780198882121.001.0001
- Swinnen, J., and J. McDermott. 2020. COVID-19 and Global Food Security. Washington, DC: International Food Policy Research Institute. https://doi.org/10.2499/p15738coll2.133762
- Swinnen, J. 2018. The Political Economy of Agricultural and Food Policies. London, United Kingdom: Palgrave MacMillan. https://doi.org//10.4324/9781315623351-21
- Swinnen, J., K. Deconinck, T. Vandemoortele, and A. Vandeplas. 2015. Quality Standards, Value Chains, and International Development. Cambridge, United Kingdom: Cambridge University Press. https://doi.org/10.1017/CBO9781139198912
- Rausser, G.C., J. Swinnen, and P. Zusman. 2011. Political Power and Economic Policy: Theory, Analysis, and Empirical Applications. Cambridge, United Kingdom: Cambridge University Press. https://doi.org/10.1017/CBO9780511978661
- Swinnen, J., and S. Rozelle. 2006. From Marx and Mao to the Market: The Economics and Politics of Agricultural Transition. Oxford, United Kingdom: Oxford University Press. https://global.oup.com/academic/product/from-marx-and-mao-to-the-market-9780199288915

== Honors and awards ==
Swinnen was elected as a Fellow of the Agricultural & Applied Economics Association (AAEA) and the European Association of Agricultural Economists (EAAE), and a Lifetime Honorary Member of the IAAE.

He received a Mercator Fellowship at the University of Göttingen in 2016, a Methusalem Research Award and Centre of Excellence Award at KU Leuven, and a Francqui Chair at the University of Ghent in 2009. He was awarded honorary doctorates from the University of Göttingen in 2017 and the Slovak University of Agriculture in Nitra in 2012.

=== Awards for publications include ===
- Publication of Enduring Quality Award from AAEA, with Miet Maertens, for the article "Trade, Standards, and Poverty: Evidence from Senegal," published in World Development, 2023
- Quality of Communication Award from AAEA, with John McDermott, for their book, blogs, and seminar series on COVID-19 and global food security, 2021
- 2019 Book Award from EAAE, for The Political Economy of Agricultural and Food Policies, 2020
- Outstanding Article Award from AAEA, with Andrea Guariso and Mara Squicciarini, for the article "Food Price Shocks and the Political Economy of Global Agricultural and Development Policies," published in Applied Economic Perspectives and Policy, 2015
- Quality of Policy Communication Award from the EAAE, with Kym Anderson and Gordon Rausser, for the article "Political Economy of Public Policies: Insights from Distortions to Agricultural and Food Markets," published in the Journal of Economic Literature, 2014
- Quality of Research Discovery Award of the AAEA, with Scott Rozelle, for the article "Success and Failure of Reforms: Insights from the Transition of Agriculture," published in the Journal of Economic Literature, 2004
