= Kenny Ausubel =

American ecologist

Kenny Ausubel (born April 20, 1949) is a social entrepreneur, investigative journalist, and award-winning filmmaker. He launched the annual National Bioneers Conference in 1990 with Nina Simons. He has received the Buckminster Fuller Institute’s Challenge Award as well as awards from the Rainforest Action Network and Global Green, among others.

Ausubel emphasizes the interdependence of all things, and the need to use nature's own diversity, kinship, community, cooperation and reciprocity in finding the urgently needed solutions to environmental and human crises.

== Background ==
At age 19 Ausubel woke up one morning paralyzed on the left side of his body. Unable to see straight or even swallow, he went to several different doctors but none of them could diagnose what had caused the stroke-like symptoms. Out of desperation Ausubel sought alternative forms of medicine where he learned what had caused his health crisis- massive exposure to chemicals called dioxins, toxic environmental pollutants. Upon learning that most people exposed to dioxin died of cancer or a stroke, Ausubel realized he was lucky to be alive and wanted to give something back to the world.

As part of his recovery process, Ausubel relocated from New York City to New Mexico to be in a healthier environment. After a brief stay in Santa Fe, he moved to a farm just outside town where he met other back-to-the-landers who taught him about organic gardening, natural building, composting toilets, solar energy, and vegetable canning.

== Early career ==
=== Hoxsey: When Healing Becomes a Crime ===
As his health was finally stabilizing, Ausubel's father back in New York City was diagnosed with cancer and died just six months later. This propelled Ausubel on a research mission to learn everything he could about alternative cancer treatments. He took a special interest in the Hoxsey Herbal Treatment and produced a film and book about it entitled Hoxsey: When Healing Becomes a Crime.

=== Seeds of Change ===
Since the Hoxsey formula was an herbal one, Ausubel became immersed in the world of botanical medicine. This pursuit led him to Gabriel Howearth who had spent years with indigenous farmers learning about traditional healing plants and ancient farming practices. In 1989 they founded Seeds of Change a seed company aiming to restore "backyard biodiversity" by selling farmers and home gardeners open-pollinated, nonhybridized seeds from crops grown for generations in the same geographic area. Ausubel served as the company's CEO from 1989 to 1994. He authored Seeds of Change: The Living Treasure about the company's mission and work.

=== Odwalla ===
In January 1995 Ausubel joined the board of directors at Odwalla, an eco-aware juice company.

== Books and films ==
Ausubel has produced several documentary films about alternative medicine including the feature documentary film Hoxsey: How Healing Becomes a Crime. The film had a special screening for members of Congress at the Kennedy Center. He also founded and operates Inner Tan Productions, a feature film development company, and has written two screenplays.

Ausubel acted as a central advisor to Leonardo DiCaprio on his feature documentary The 11th Hour, and appears in the film.

Ausubel has written several books— When Healing Becomes a Crime: The Amazing Story of the Hoxsey Cancer Clinics and the Return of Alternative Therapies (2000); The Bioneers: Declarations of Interdependence (1995) and Seeds of Change: The Living Treasure (1994). His most recent book is Dreaming the Future: Reimagining Civilization in the Age of Nature (2012).

== Personal life ==
Ausubel attended Yale and graduated Phi Beta Kappa from Columbia University in 1972. He lives in the mountains outside Santa Fe, New Mexico with his wife Nina and their two dogs.
