= Organic Trade Association =

Coordinates: 42.589464°N 72.605111°W

The Organic Trade Association (OTA) is a membership-based business association that focuses on the organic business community in North America. OTA's mission is to promote ethical consumerism by promoting and protecting the growth of organic trade to benefit the environment, farmers, the public, and the economy. OTA is a member of IFOAM – Organics International and The International Working Group on the Global Organic Textile Standard.

The Organic Trade Association (OTA) was formed by the consolidation of the Organic Foods Production Association of North America (OFPANA) and the Organic Food Alliance (OFA). The original goals of the organization included creating uniform standards for organic production and handling, establishing an accreditation program for organic certification bodies, and promoting organic food in the marketplace.

Creating a definition required synergy between science and consumer behaviors. As well as a cross-examination of previous definitions that would form a baseline.

== Lobbying ==
Since 1998, the OTA has extensively lobbied regulatory agencies. The OTA had a total of $316,150 in lobbying expenditures for 2013. In 2012, the OTA spent a total of $369,494 on lobbying expenditures. Between 1998 and 2014, the OTA invested over $1.5 million in lobbying. Agencies typically lobbied by the OTA include the U.S. Senate, U.S. House of Representatives, U.S. Department of Agriculture, Environmental Protection Agency, Office of Management and Budget, and the Food & Drug Administration.

== Criticism ==
The OTA Rider attached to the Agriculture Appropriations Act, which the USDA approved and passed before Congress in 2006, opened the door for non-organic, non-agricultural, and synthetic additives in food products bearing the "organic" label.

== See also ==
- Organic agriculture
- Organic Certification
- Organic Food
- Organic Farming
