= Seeds of Change (company) =

Organic seed and food company

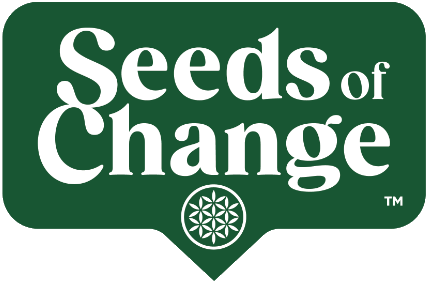
- Company type: Subsidiary
- Industry: Food
- Founded: 1989; 37 years ago
- Founder: Gabriel Howearth; Kenny Ausubel
- Fate: Acquired by Mars, Inc. in 1995
- Headquarters: Chicago, United States
- Products: Organic food
- Parent: Mars, Inc.
- Website: seedsofchange.com

Seeds of Change is an organic seed and food company headquartered in Chicago. A subsidiary of Mars, Inc. since 1995, until summer 2010 the company was based in Santa Fe, New Mexico, and producers of a line of processed organic foods including pasta sauces and salad dressings.

Seeds of Change was founded in 1989 by Gabriel Howearth and Kenny Ausubel, as a seed company specializing in organics . The company devotes 1% of its net sales toward sustainable organic farming initiatives.

== Research farm (Now Closed) ==
The Seeds of Change Research Farm and Gardens was founded in 1989 in Gila, New Mexico by Gabriel Howearth. By 1996, the Research Farm moved north to a site closer to the company's Santa Fe offices. The farm included over a thousand varieties of plants on six acres of land originally cultivated by the Tewa people on a flood plain along the Rio Grande in El Guique, New Mexico. The farm was certified organic by Oregon Tilth.

In August 2010, Mars announced that it would close the farm and move some management to Los Angeles. A final tour of the farm was provided on Saturday, 14 August 2010. A spokesperson for Mars indicated the closure was due to a "strategic shift" and that not all the employees would retain their jobs.

== 1% Fund ==
In a partnership with Conservation International, Seeds of Change seeks to strengthen and protect traditional shade cropping cabruca cacao cultivation in Brazil. The 1% Fund also supports the Environmental Working Group, the Organic Trade Association, the Organic Center, and the Organic Farming Research Foundation.
