= Aegean art =

Bronze Age art from land near or within the Aegean Sea

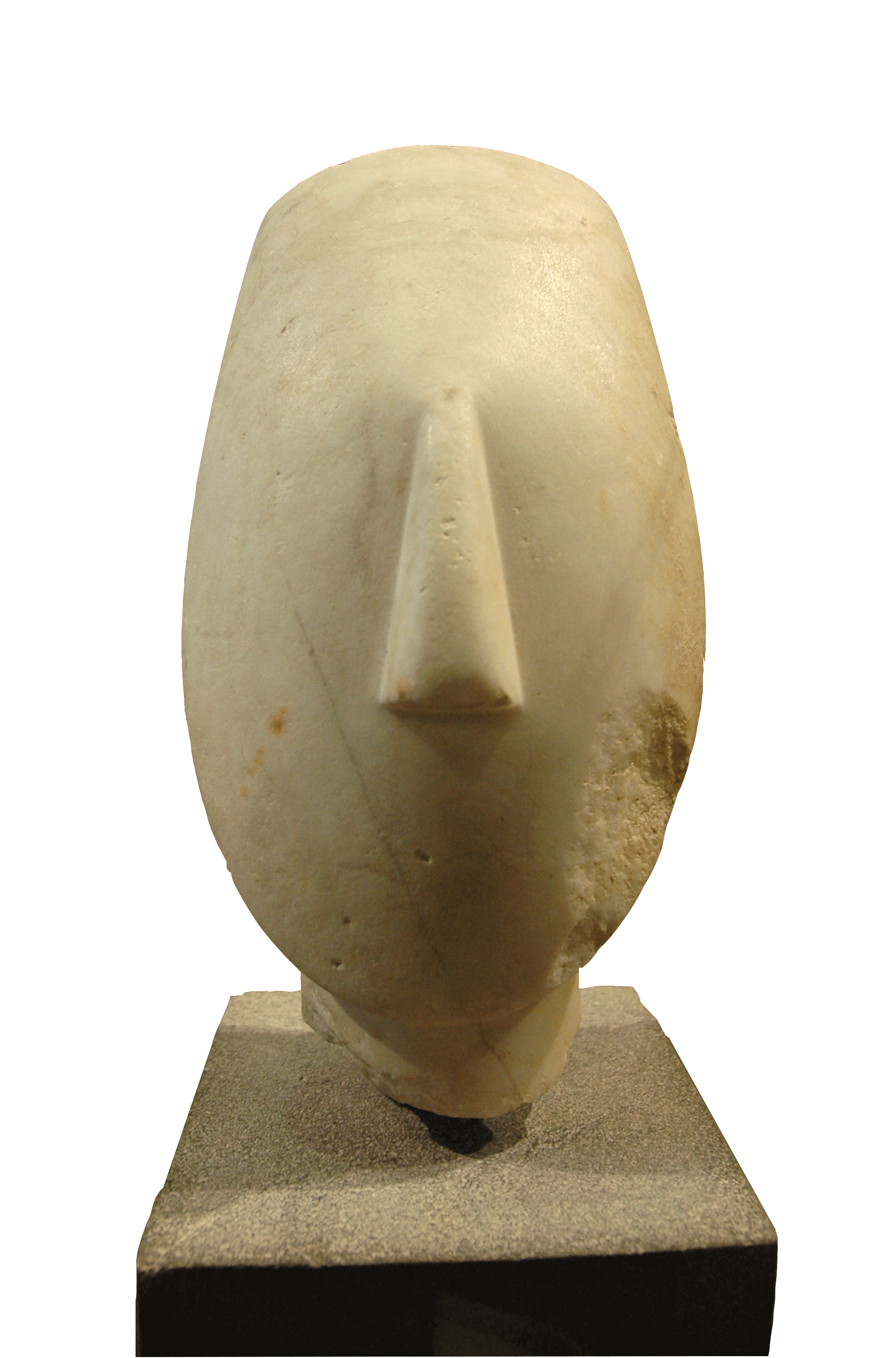
Figure from the Cyclades, popularized by its appearance at the Athens 2004 Olympic games opening ceremony. Early Cycladic II (2700 BC–2300 BC).

Aegean art (2800–1100 BC) is art that was created in the lands surrounding, and the islands within, the Aegean Sea during the Bronze Age, that is, until the 11th century BC, before Ancient Greek art. Because it is mostly found in the territory of modern Greece, it is sometimes called Greek Bronze Age art, though it includes not just the art of the Mycenaean Greeks, but also that of the Cycladic and Minoan cultures, which converged over time.

Cycladic art is known for its simple figurines carved in white marble; Minoan art for its palace complexes with frescos, imagery of bulls and bull-leaping, and sophisticated pottery and jewellery; and Mycenaean art for its lavish metalwork in gold, imagery of combat and massively-constructed citadels and tombs. These are very different arts, reflecting very different cultures. For this reason, many art historians consider the term "Aegean art" inappropriate, as it reflects mere geographic proximity and not cultural or artistic unity. Others point to the many communalities, especially following the "process of Minoanization from c. 1700 upwards" over the other parts of the region, and the difficulty at several times and places in deciding whether excavated objects were imported or made locally.

In the Bronze Age, about 2800–1100 BC, despite cultural interchange by way of trade with the contemporaneous civilizations of Egypt and Mesopotamia, the Aegean cultures developed their own highly distinctive styles. After the Greek Bronze Age civilizations collapsed, the early part of the Greek Dark Ages saw minimal artistic production until the Protogeometric style in pottery emerged about 1050 BC, which is taken as the first phase of "Ancient Greek art". This traditional disjunction was to some extent a result of the uncertainty as to whether the Mycenaean Linear B script recorded a form of Greek or not. This was settled when the script was decoded in the 1950s, confirming it was Greek. The Minoan Linear A is clearly not Greek, however.

The elegant art of the Aegean daidala figurines has recently been used at the 2004 Summer Olympics, held at Athens; specifically, during the opening ceremony and as the original idea behind the games mascots: Athina and Fivos.

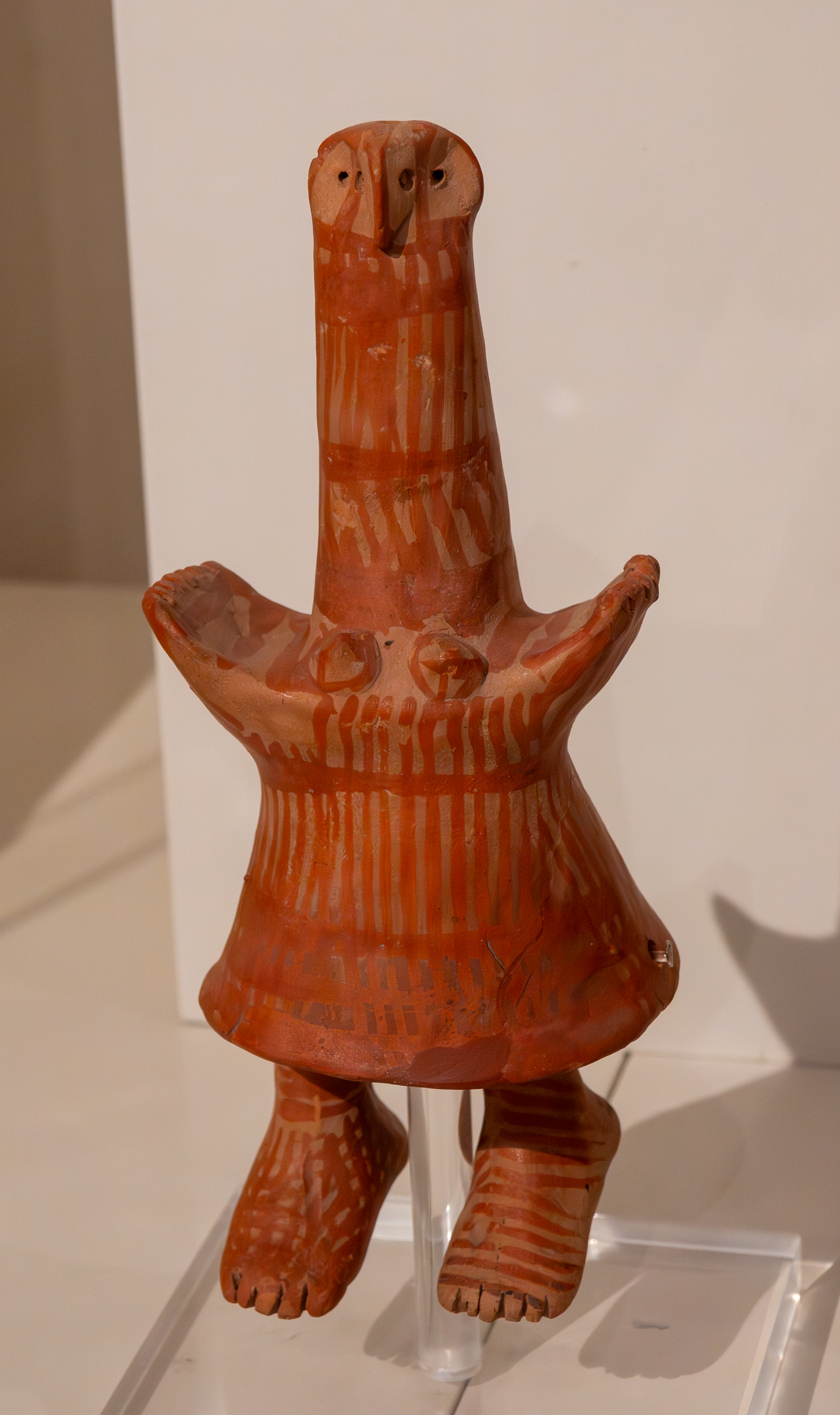
The Athens 2004's mascots were based on this clay model at the National Archaeological Museum

This type of figurines are furthermore particularly intriguing, because of the high resemblance they have with modern sculptures (e.g. Henry Moore's works).

== Minoan art ==
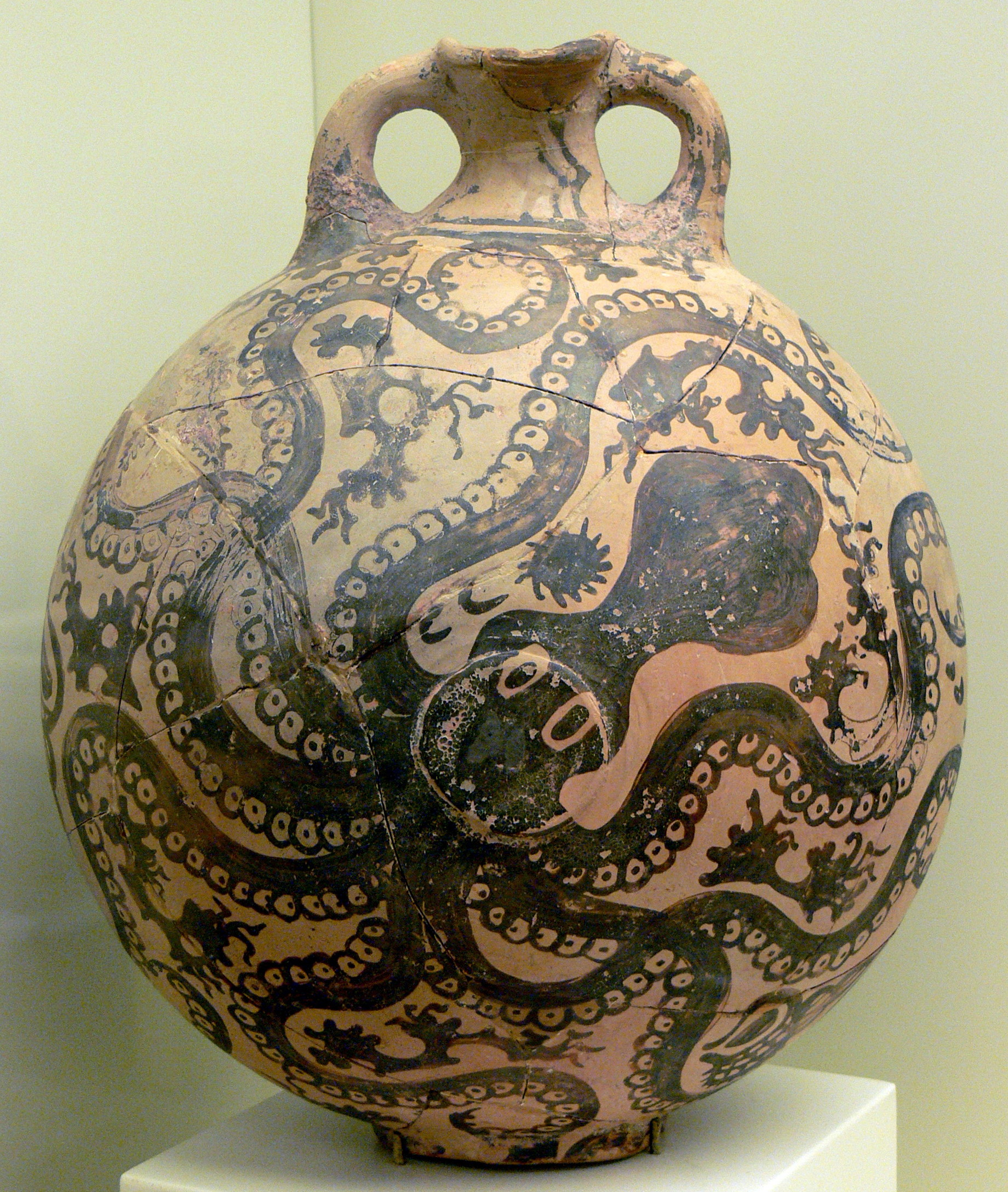
Minoan pottery "Marine Style" flask with octopus, c. 1500-1450 BC

Minoan civilization was disrupted at intervals by natural disasters and perhaps invasions, before eventually becoming controlled by the Mycenaens. Minoan art is very elegant, rhythmic and full of movement.

=== Architecture ===
The Minoan civilization is known for constructing several large and great palaces, most commonly Knossos, Phaistos, and Malia which were destroyed around 1700 BC and rebuilt and then suffered some destruction again around 1500 BC. The "new" palaces are the main source of information on Minoan architecture. The palace of Knossos called the Palace of Minos is the most elaborate and ambitious of the three. It is characterized by a vast number of rooms over a large amount of land. It has currently been excavated and partially restored. Minoan architecture is defined by its numerous porticoes, staircases, storerooms, workshops, and air shafts that would have provided the structure with an open feeling. Interior rooms are typically small with low ceilings, but have richly decorated walls. Although none have survived, by depiction in painting and sculpture it is known that columns in the Minoan palaces were constructed of wood. Minoan architecture are thought to be a place of not only royal residence but the administrative center and commercial activity.

=== Paintings, pottery and reliefs ===
Between 2000 and 1700 BC Minoan pottery is defined by its technical perfection and dynamic swirling ornament and its art is characterized by its naturalistic and rhythmic movement. Many murals and reliefs were scenes from nature depicting animals, birds, and sea creatures in lush vegetation; marine life being favored. Most images are flat in form and silhouetted against backgrounds of solid color. Forms from this era typically portray a weightlessness as they seem to float or sway. Human figures are painted as slim-waisted and athletic in body type for both male and female differentiating only in skin color; females are lighter in skin tone.

== Cycladic art ==
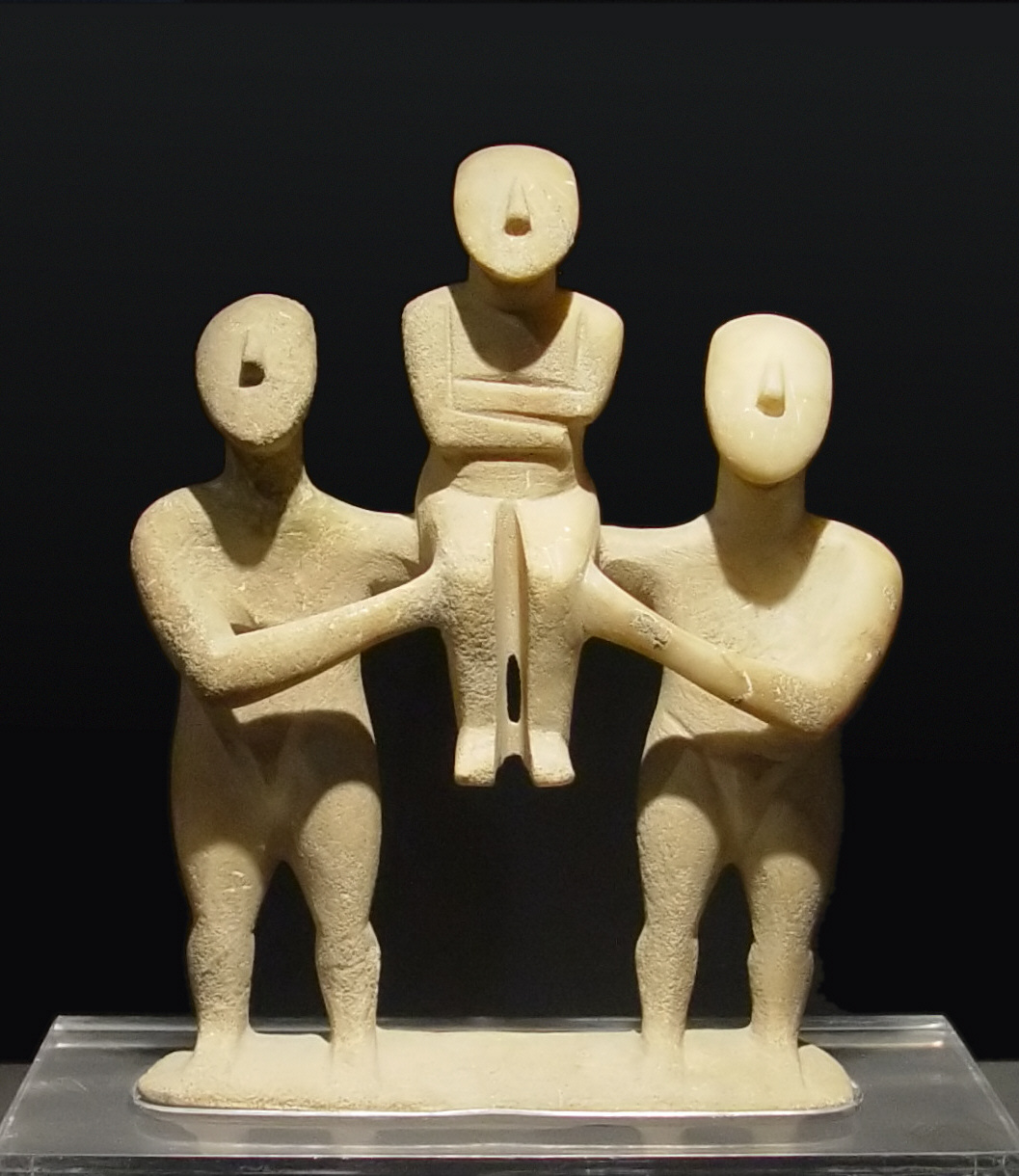
Group of three Cycladic figurines, early Spedos type, Keros-Syros culture (EC II)

Cycladic art was produced by the Cycladic culture between 3000 BC, or even earlier, and 1100 BC, so covering both part of the Neolithic and the whole of the Bronze Age in the Greek islands. The most famous and distinctive type of Cycladic art is a large number of marble figures, almost all representing a standing female nude figure, with arms folded across chest, and a blank face apart from the nose. However, there are signs that they were originally painted. Some 1400 of these are known, most taken from unknown tombs to satisfy the art market.

The female figures are thought to represent the mother and fertility goddess. Cycladic nude figurines are highly stylized and distinctive to the area. They are defined by very flat, wedge shaped bodies, columnar necks and oval featureless faces apart from well defined noses. Figures have very subtle curves and subtle markings of knees and abdomen.

Cycladic pottery was often elegantly shaped and painted, with a concentration on pouring vessels like jugs, often with raised spouts. There are also kernoi stands for offerings or lamps. There are some animal figurines or animal-shaped rhyta and vessels including small boxes were made, as well as distinctive decorated round discs, around 20 cm across, that are nicknamed "frying pans" by archaeologists. The function of these is uncertain; possibly a concave side was filled with fluid and used as a mirror. There was much influence from Minoan pottery. Some very early kernoi and Frying pans had been made of stone.

== Mycenaean art ==
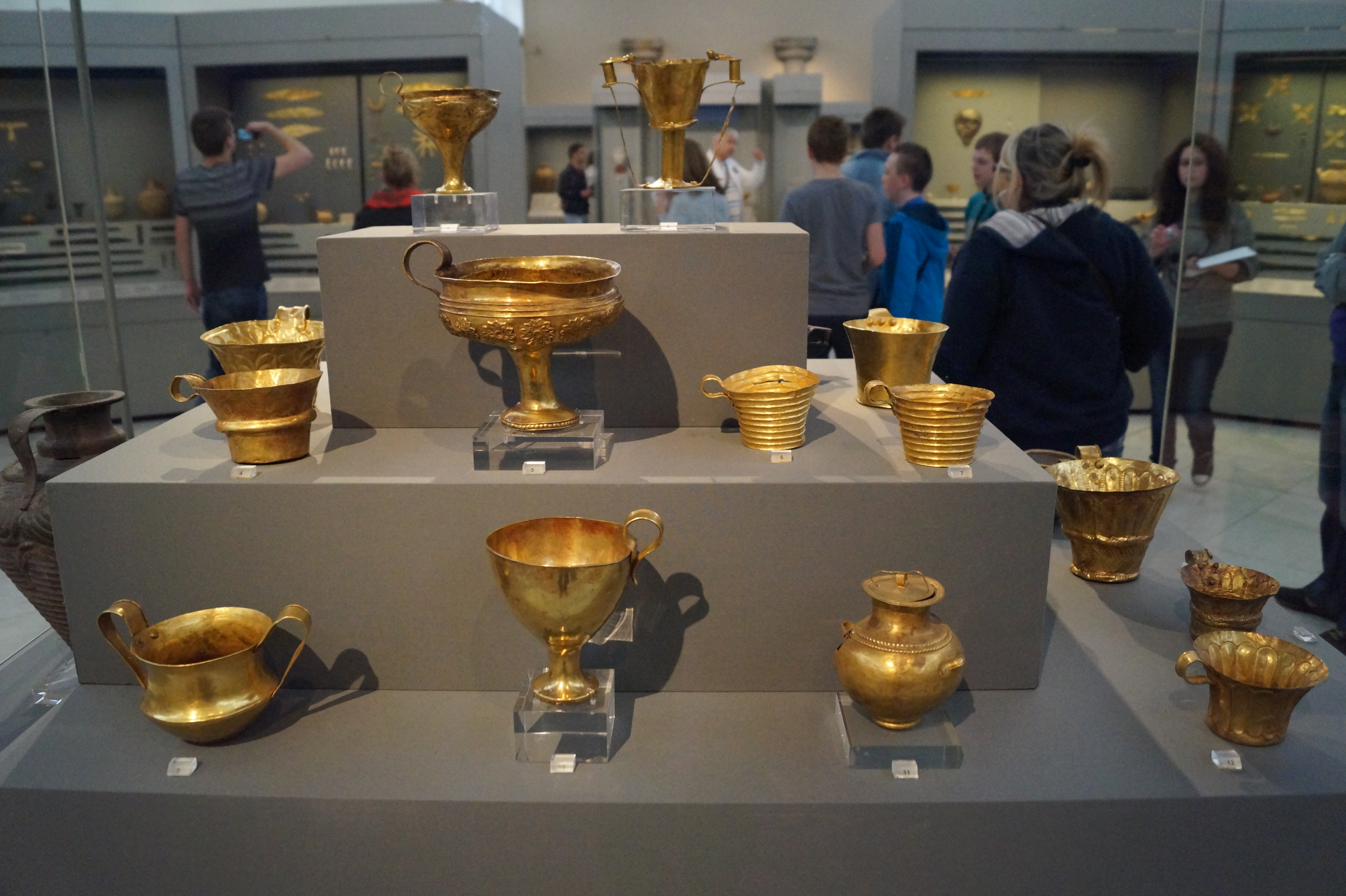
Gold cups from Grave IV and V (Grave Circle A), Mycenae

Mycenaean art is most prominently dated between 1600 and 1100 BC during the Late Helladic period of Greece. Mycenean art is named after the inhabitants of Mycenae descending from early Greek tribes of 2000 BC and approximately 3000 to 1100 BC. Mycenaean pottery is much the most common type of art to survive, and was often exported to Italy. The Warrior Vase is an unusually fine vase with painted figures.

In many portable forms of art, and for painting, the Mycenaeans relied on the Minoan art of Crete, which probably sometimes reached them in the form of imported objects, sometimes by imported artists and trainers of Greek artists.

=== Metalwork ===
Several important pieces in gold and other metals come from the Gold grave goods at Grave Circles A and B at Mycenae, including the Mask of Agamemnon, Silver Siege Rhyton, Bulls-head rhyton, and gold Nestor's Cup. The Theseus Ring, found in Athens, but probably Cretan, is one of the finest of a number of gold signet rings with tiny multi-figure scenes of high quality, many from the princely Grave Circles A and B at Mycenae. These "raise in an acute form the related questions of how to distinguish mainland from Cretan work, and the significance of any distinction that may exist".

=== Architecture ===
Mycenaean palaces were generally placed on hilltops surrounded by defensive walls constructed of large stone blocks. The Lion Gate is one of the few remaining decorated structures of Mycenaean architecture. Gates such as the latter functioned as guardians of the gate. At the center of the palaces were royal audience halls called the Megaron defined by a round hearth in the center and four columns supporting its roof. Structures always featured roofs of fired tiles.

=== Sculpture ===
There is little large or monumental sculpture from Mycenaean Greece; what there is comes mainly from palaces, or reliefs on grave stelae, in particular the group of Grave stelai from Grave Circle A, Mycenae. These show similar subjects to the metalwork from the graves, but with rather cruder workmanship.

Great numbers of sites produce pottery figurines, mostly very stylized, such as the Psi and phi type figurines. There are small sculpted scenes, reliefs or intaglios, of high quality in various media, including metal, hardstone carving, and ivory. The remarkable Pylos Combat Agate seal, found in an elite grave on the mainland, was perhaps made in Crete.
