= Grave stelai from Grave Circle A, Mycenae =

Steles from Mycenae

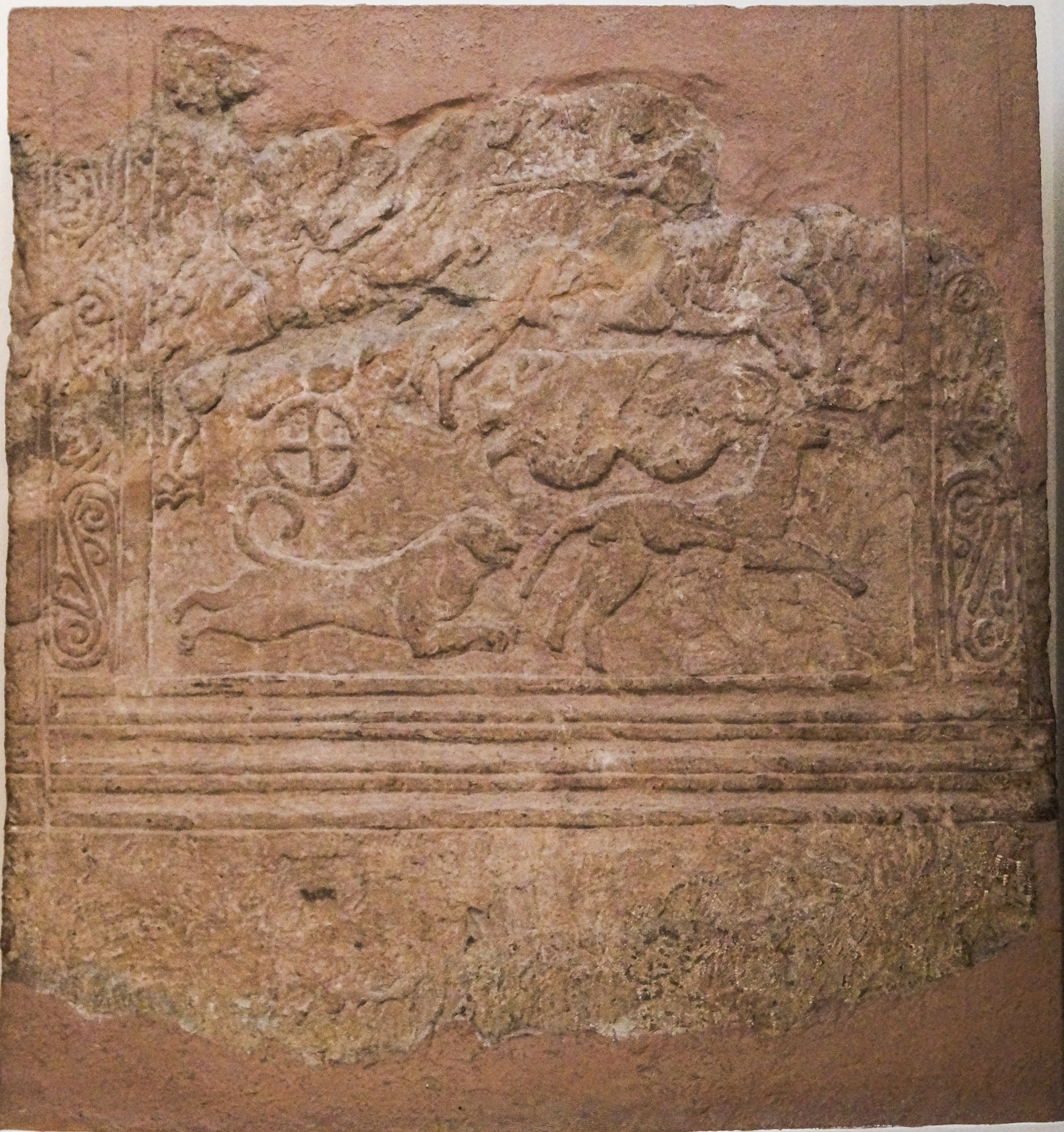
Grave Stele I, "Simile," from Grave Circle A, Mycenae. Currently on display at the National Archaeological Museum of Athens.

There were a number of grave stelai or stelae found among the six shaft graves at Grave Circle A in the site of Mycenae. These stelai mark the burial sites of the Mycenaean dead, much like modern headstones. At least 21 stelai have been discovered from Grave Circle A, with 12 having identifiable relief sculpture. Most were upright, rectangular slabs of oolithic limestone, ranging in date from 1600 to 1500 BCE. The iconography depicted on these stelai include chariot scenes, hunting scenes, and circular and spiral designs characteristic of the Greek Mycenaean Period. Scholars argue that these scenes demonstrate the prevalence of warfare in Mycenaean culture, in addition to signifying a socially stratified society.

== Description ==
All 21 stelai found at Grave Circle A were cut from oolithic limestone, a material used in many other Mycenaean constructions. Many of these stelai just survive in fragments, though most are rectangular in shape. To incise the stelai, Mycenaean artists carved out the background of a previously sketched image, creating a raised relief. Tools, such as the compass, and templates were likely used to carve the sculptures. Scholars also speculate that the stelai might have been painted. Most of the iconography consists of geometric motifs, including circles and spirals. Figural imagery, including chariot scenes with humans and large animals like horses and lions, also appear on the stelai. The stelai are stylistically similar to the grave stelai found at Grave Circle B, but neither groups of stelai resemble similar pieces created by Minoans.

=== Carved Stelai ===
- Stele I, or the "Simile" stele, consists of a central scene framed by two columns of spiral motifs. The center depicts a man in a chariot directing a horse running over a man, possibly armored, lying down. Below the chariot scene, a lion is depicted chasing a quadruped animal.
- Stele II, or the "Wellenband" stele, consists of three carved columns, the outside of which depict a curving, meander motif, potentially resembling a snake.
- Stele III, or the "Spirals" stele, consists of four vertical columns containing spiral motifs, with circles carved in between spirals.
- Stele IV, or the "Cartoon" stele, consists of three horizontal panels of sculpture, with the top and bottom panels containing spiral motifs. The middle panel depicts a chariot scene, with a man driving the chariot and another man before the chariot with a possible weapon.
- Stele V, or the "Over the Sea" stele, consists of two horizontal panels of sculpture, with the top panel containing a spiral motif. The bottom panel depicts a man in a chariot, directing a horse with reins, with a secondary male figure on the right of the scene, carrying a possible weapon.
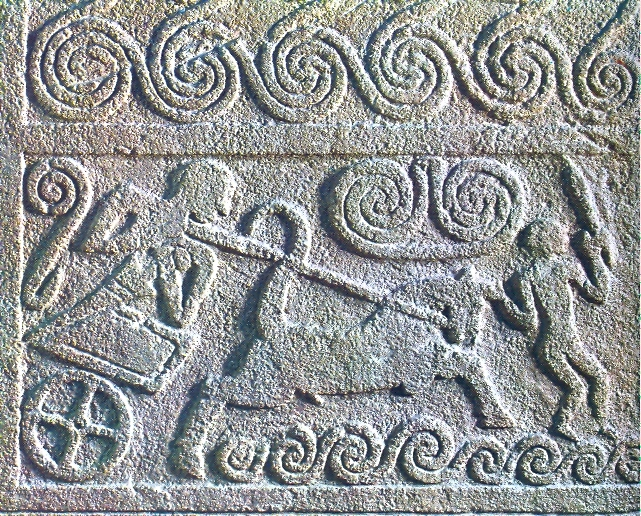
  Grave Stele V, "Over the Sea," from Grave Circle A, Mycenae. Currently on display at the National Archaeological Museum of Athens.
- Stele VI, or the "Horsey" stele, consists of a frame of spiral motifs, with a central panel containing four rearing horses, stacked on top of one another.
- Stele VII is mostly fragmentary, but contains spiral motifs and the head of a horse.
- Stele VIII is also mostly fragmentary, but contains spiral motifs, a wheel, the head of a possible charioteer, and the hoof of a possible horse.
- Stele IX contains another chariot scene with spiral motifs.
- Stelai X, XI, and XII exist in fragments, and could theoretically belong to the same stele. Heads of horses and humans, as well as potential feet can be seen on these stele fragments.

== Meaning ==
Since chariots were a common aspect of Bronze Age warfare in the Near East and Egypt, scholars have often speculated that the chariot scenes depicted on these grave stelai (Specifically I, IV, V, and VIII) evidence a culture which places heavy importance on warfare. However, other scholars doubt this interpretation, as Greece's mountainous terrain would make chariots difficult to use in warfare. Another argument determines that the main function of these grave stelai is to be status symbols, with "heroic" imagery. They argue that the presence of opulent grave goods in the graves marked by the stelai further supports this interpretation.

Since only six shaft graves were located in Grave Circle A, many scholars, such as John G. Younger, speculate why there were so many stelai in relation to burial sites. Younger concludes that the stelai do not refer to any specific burial, but instead represent a collective of the bodies buried in Circle A. However, Giampaolo Graziadio suggests that graves might have more than one stele as a status indicator. The presence of so many stelai in Grave Circle A also distinguishes it from Grave Circle B.

Furthermore, scholars use the iconography on the stelai to interpret the lives of the Mycenaean people. John G. Younger attempts to infer the gender of the deceased individual from the stelai designs, stating that while the chariot scenes likely refer to men, the geometric textile-like designs may refer to women. J.C. Wright uses the symbology present on the grave stelai to demonstrate changing mortuary practices from the Shaft Graves of the early Mycenaean period to the tholos tombs of the Late Mycenaean period. He says that the grave stele, a small marker emphasizing ties among the elite, were later replaced by the tholos tomb, a more outward and monumental form of burial practice. Therefore, scholars often use the images and function of these stelai to illuminate the cultural practices of the Mycenaeans themselves.

== Gallery ==
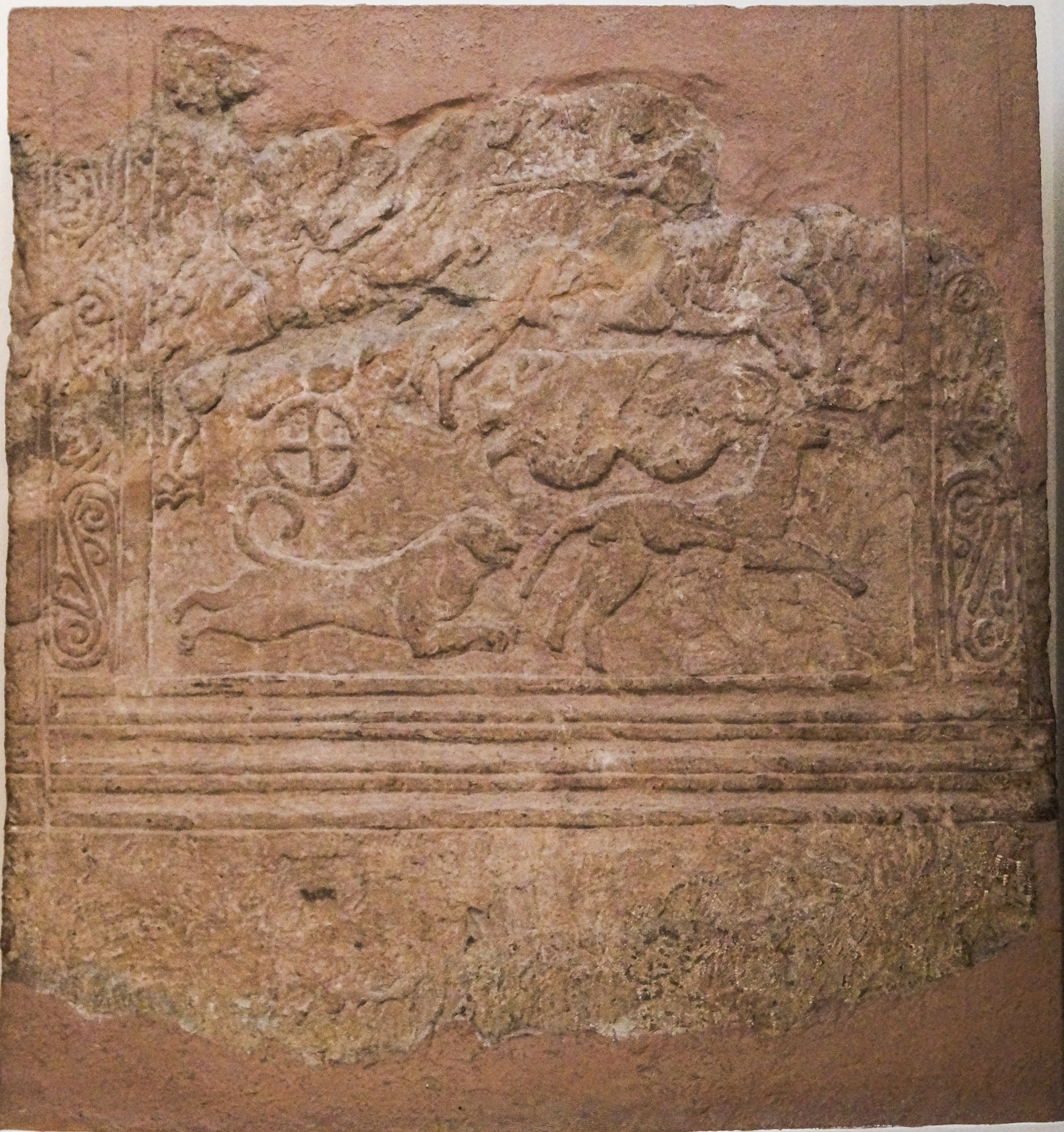
Grave Stele I, "Simile," from Grave Circle A, Mycenae. Currently on display at the National Archaeological Museum of Athens.

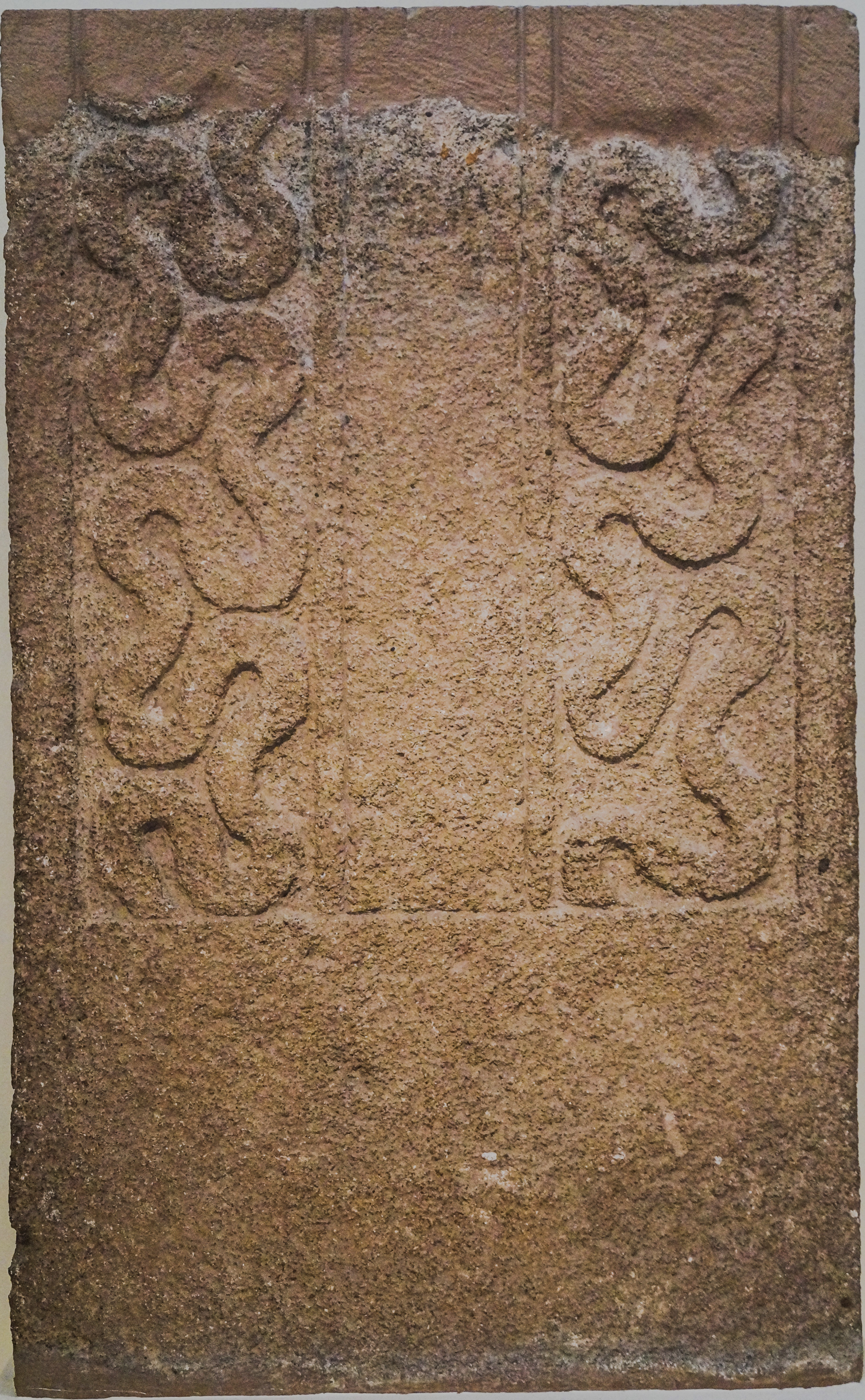
Grave Stele II, "Wellenbrand," from Grave Circle A, Mycenae.

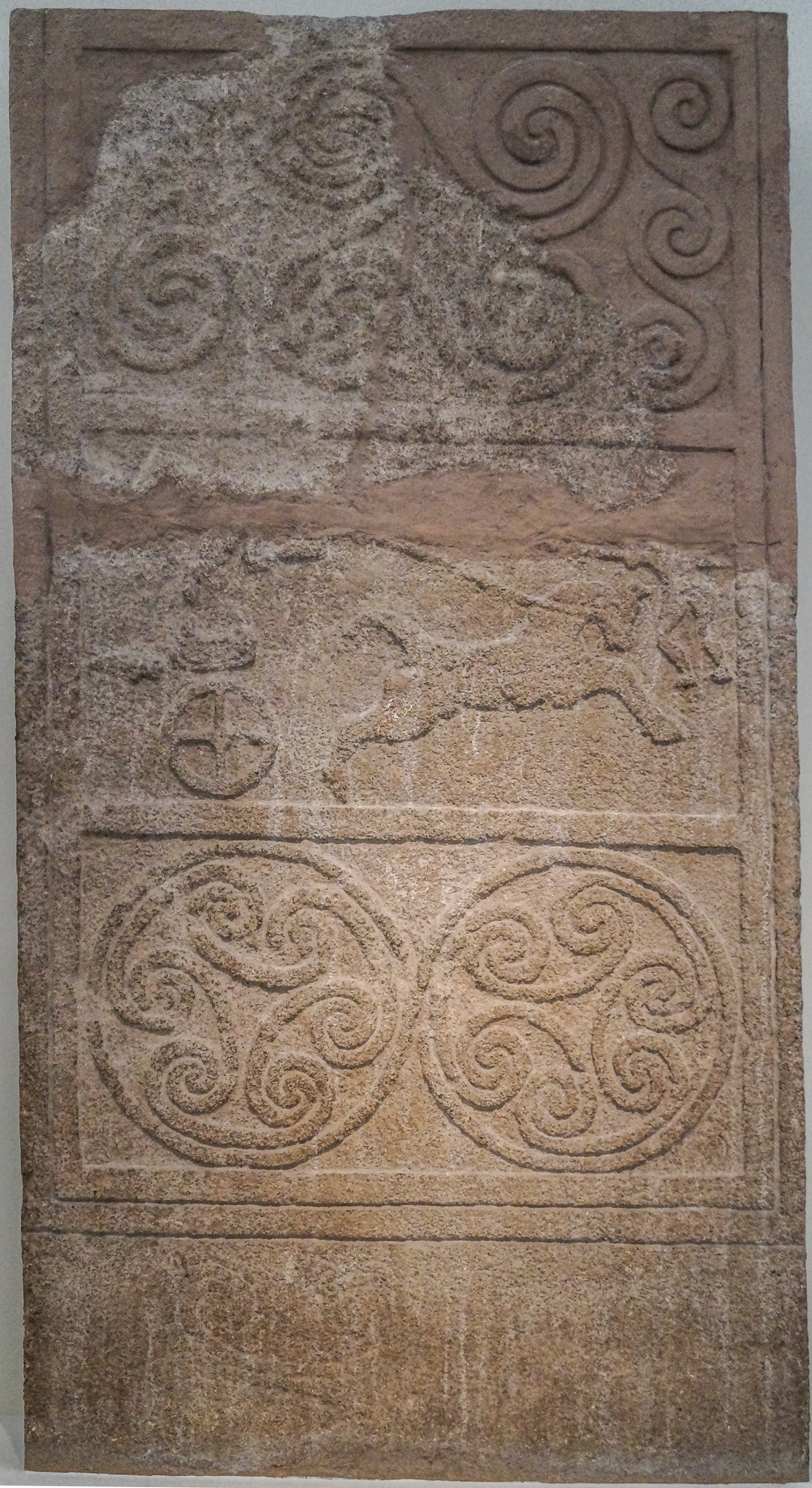
Grave Stele IV, "Cartoon," from Grave Circle A, Mycenae.

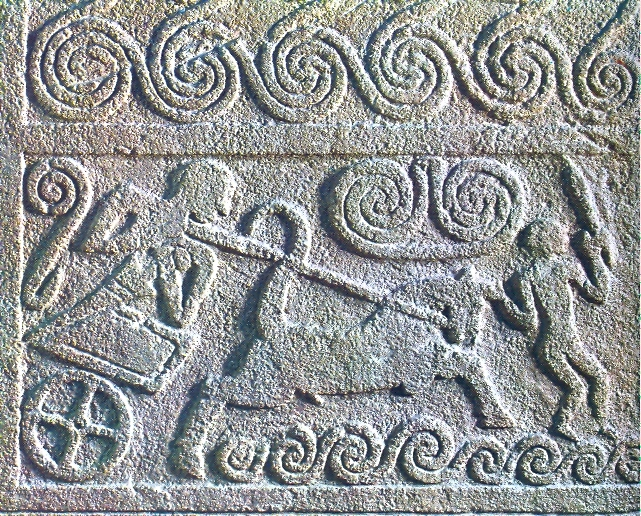
Grave Stele V, "Over the Sea," from Grave Circle A, Mycenae. Currently on display at the National Archaeological Museum of Athens.

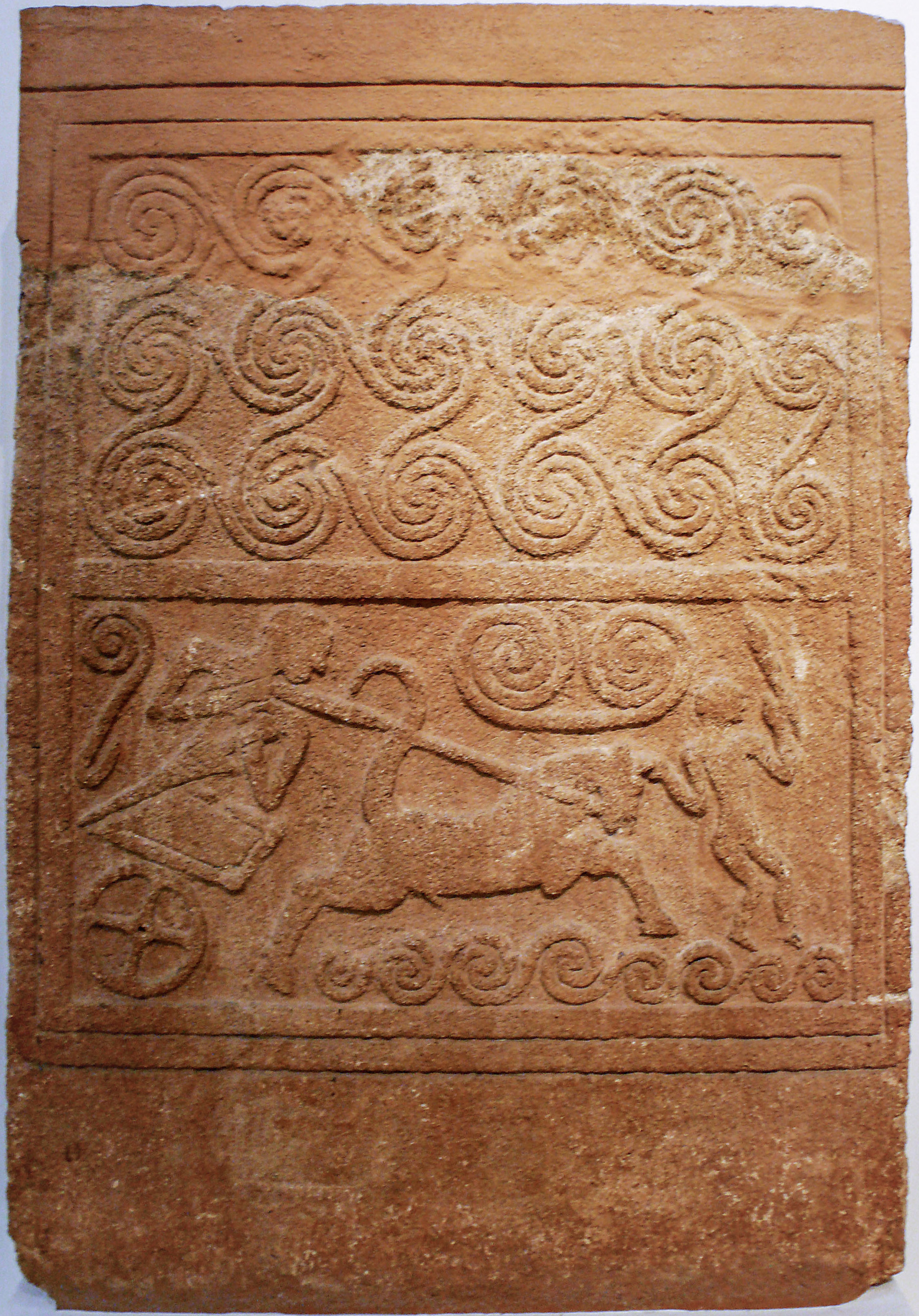
Grave Stele V, "Over the Sea," from Grave Circle A, Mycenae. Currently on display at the National Archaeological Museum of Athens.
