= Grave Circle A, Mycenae =

16th-century BC royal cemetery in southern Greece

Grave Circle A
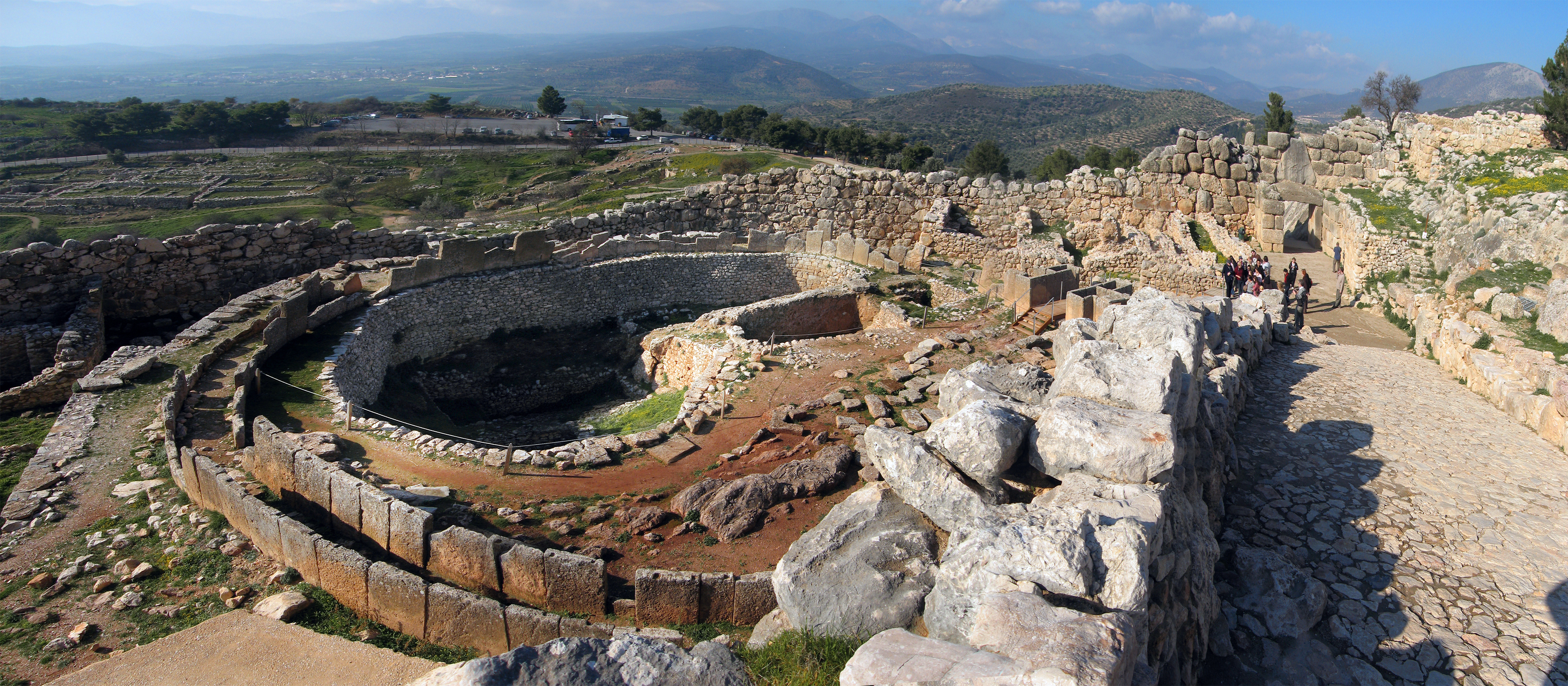
- Grave Circle A (left) and the main entrance of the citadel (right)

- Location within Greece
- 37°43′50″N 22°45′23″E
- Location: Mycenae

History
- Formed: 16th century BC
- Built for: Resting place of the Mycenaean ruling families

Site notes
- Area: Argolis, Greece

Grave Circle A is a 16th-century BC royal cemetery situated to the south of the Lion Gate, the main entrance of the Bronze Age citadel of Mycenae in southern Greece. This burial complex was initially constructed outside the walls of Mycenae and ultimately enclosed in the acropolis when the fortification was extended during the 13th century BC. Grave Circle A and Grave Circle B, the latter found outside the walls of Mycenae, represents one of the significant characteristics of the early phase of the Mycenaean civilization.

The site circle has a diameter of 27.5 m (90 ft) and contains six shaft graves. The largest of the shaft graves measures about 6.5 m (21 ft 4 in) in length and about 4.1 m (13 ft 5 in) in width. A total of nineteen bodies of men, women, and children buried here, with two to five bodies per shaft. It has been suggested that a mound was constructed over each grave, and funeral stelae were erected. Among the funerary gifts found were a series of gold death masks, full sets of weapons, ornate staffs, gold jewelry, as well as gold and silver cups. The funerary gifts found here are more precious than that of those at Grave Circle B. It has been estimated that Circle A contained about 15 kilos of gold in total (not all of high purity); a considerable quantity, but a good deal less than in just the inner coffin of Tutankhamun.

The site was excavated by the archaeologist Heinrich Schliemann and Panagiotis Stamatakis in 1876–77, following the descriptions of Homer and Pausanias. One of the five gold death masks he unearthed became known as "The Death Mask of Agamemnon", ruler of Mycenae, of Greek mythology. However, it has been proven that the burials are dated approximately three centuries earlier before Agamemnon is supposed to have lived.

The valuable funerary gifts in the graves suggest that powerful rulers were buried in this site. Although Agamemnon was supposed to have lived centuries later, these graves might have belonged to the former ruling dynasty of Mycenae – in Greek mythology, the Perseids. In later Greek mythology, Mycenae had a period where two kings ruled, and archeologists have suggested that these dual graves may correspond to both kings.

== Background ==
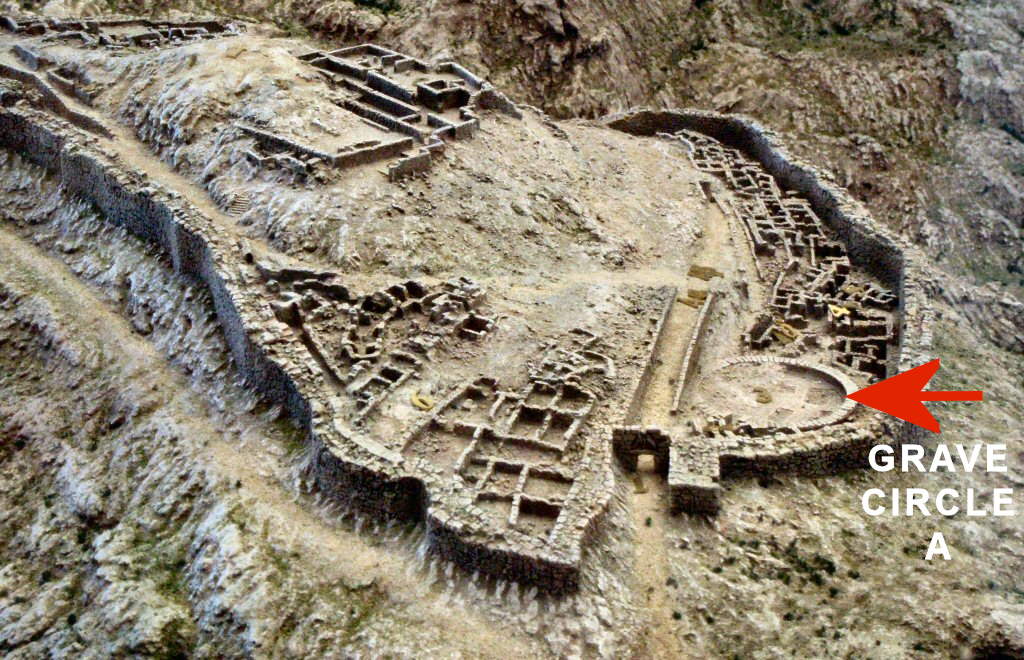
Model of Mycenae. Grave Circle A is located to the right after the main entrance.

During the end of the 3rd millennium BC (c. 2200 BC), the indigenous inhabitants of mainland Greece underwent a cultural transformation attributed to climate change, local events and developments (i.e. destruction of the "House of the Tiles"), as well as to continuous contacts with various areas such as western Asia Minor, the Cyclades, Albania, and Dalmatia. These Bronze Age people were equipped with horses, surrounded themselves with luxury goods, and constructed elaborate shaft graves. The acropolis of Mycenae, one of the leading centers of Mycenaean culture, located in Argolis, northeast Peloponnese, was built on a defensive hill at an elevation of 128 m (420 ft) and covers an area of 30,000 m^{2} (320,000 ft^{2}). The shaft graves found in Mycenae signified the elevation of a local Greek-speaking royal dynasty whose economic power depended on long-distance sea trade.

== History ==
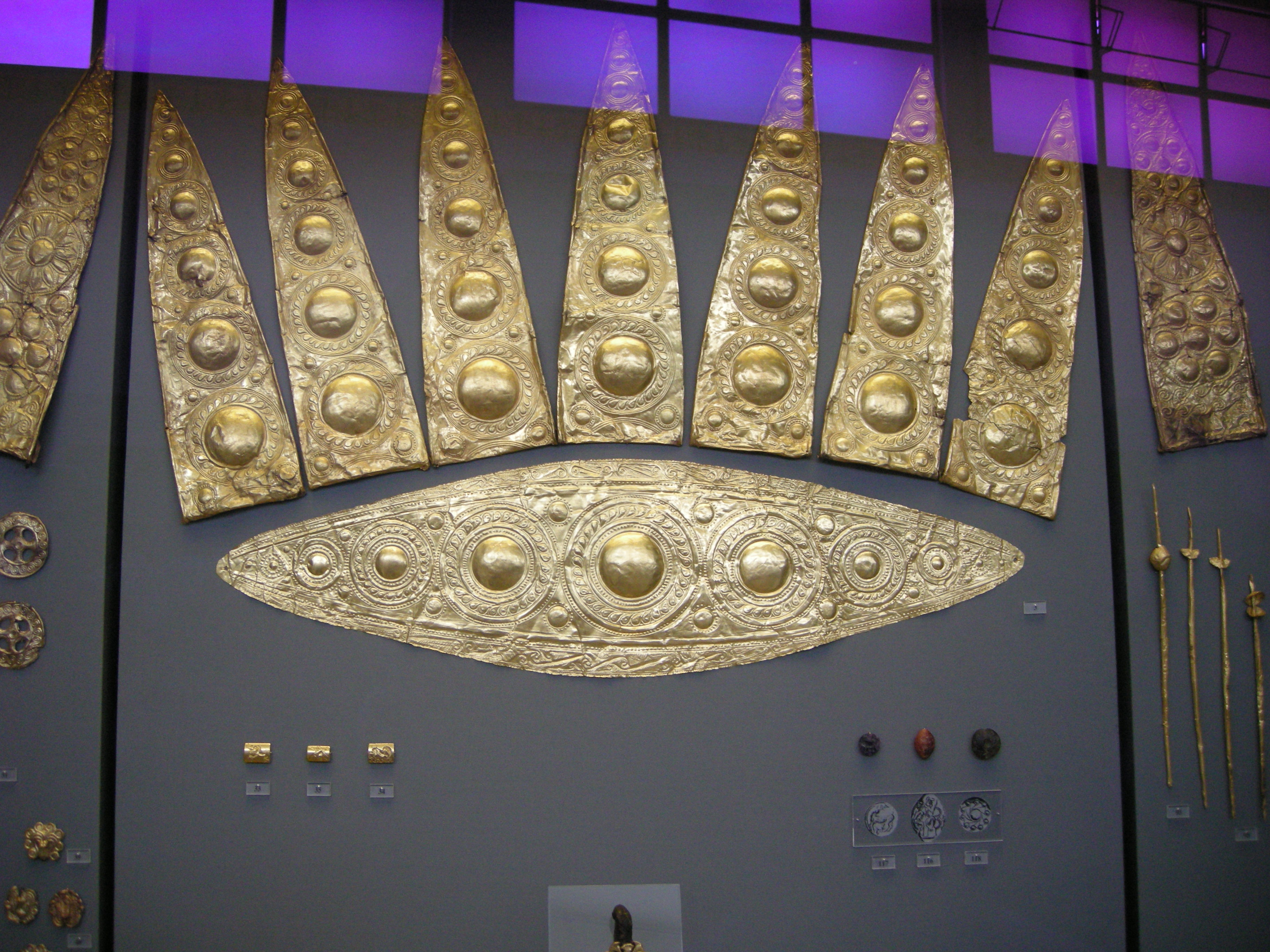
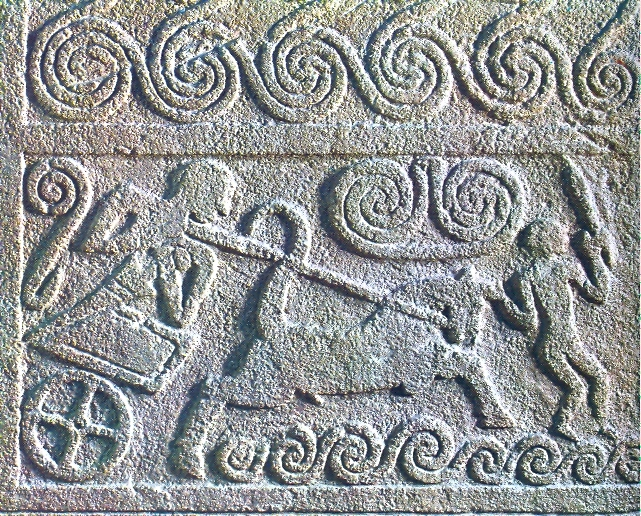
Gold elliptical diadem, Grave III, (left) and part of a funeral stele depicting a chariot scene (right).

Mycenaean shaft graves are essentially an Argive variant of the Middle Helladic funerary tradition with features derived from the Early Bronze Age developed locally in mainland Greece. Grave Circle A, formed circa 1600 BC as a new elite burial place, was probably first restricted to men and seems to be a continuation of the earlier Grave Circle B and correlates with the general social trend of higher burial investment taking place throughout entire Greece that time. The Grave Circle A site was part of a more significant funeral place from the Middle Helladic period. During the Late Helladic I (1600 BC), there might have been a small unfortified palace on Mycenae, while the Mycenaean ruling family graves remained outside the city walls. There is no evidence of a circular wall around the site during the period of the burials. The last interment took place circa 1500 BC.

Immediately after the last interment, the local rulers abandoned the shaft graves in favor of a new and more imposing form of tomb already developing in Messenia, in the southern Peloponnese, the tholos. Around 1250 BC, when the fortifications of Mycenae were extended, the Grave Circle was included inside the new wall. A double-ring peribolos wall was also built around the area. It appears that the site became a temenos (sacred precinct), while a circular construction, possibly an altar was found above one grave. The burial site had been replanned as a monument, an attempt by the 13th century BC Mycenaean rulers to appropriate the possible heroic past of the older ruling dynasty. Under this context, the land was constructed to create a level precinct for ceremonies and re-erected the stelae. A new entrance, the Lion Gate, was constructed near the site.

== Finds ==
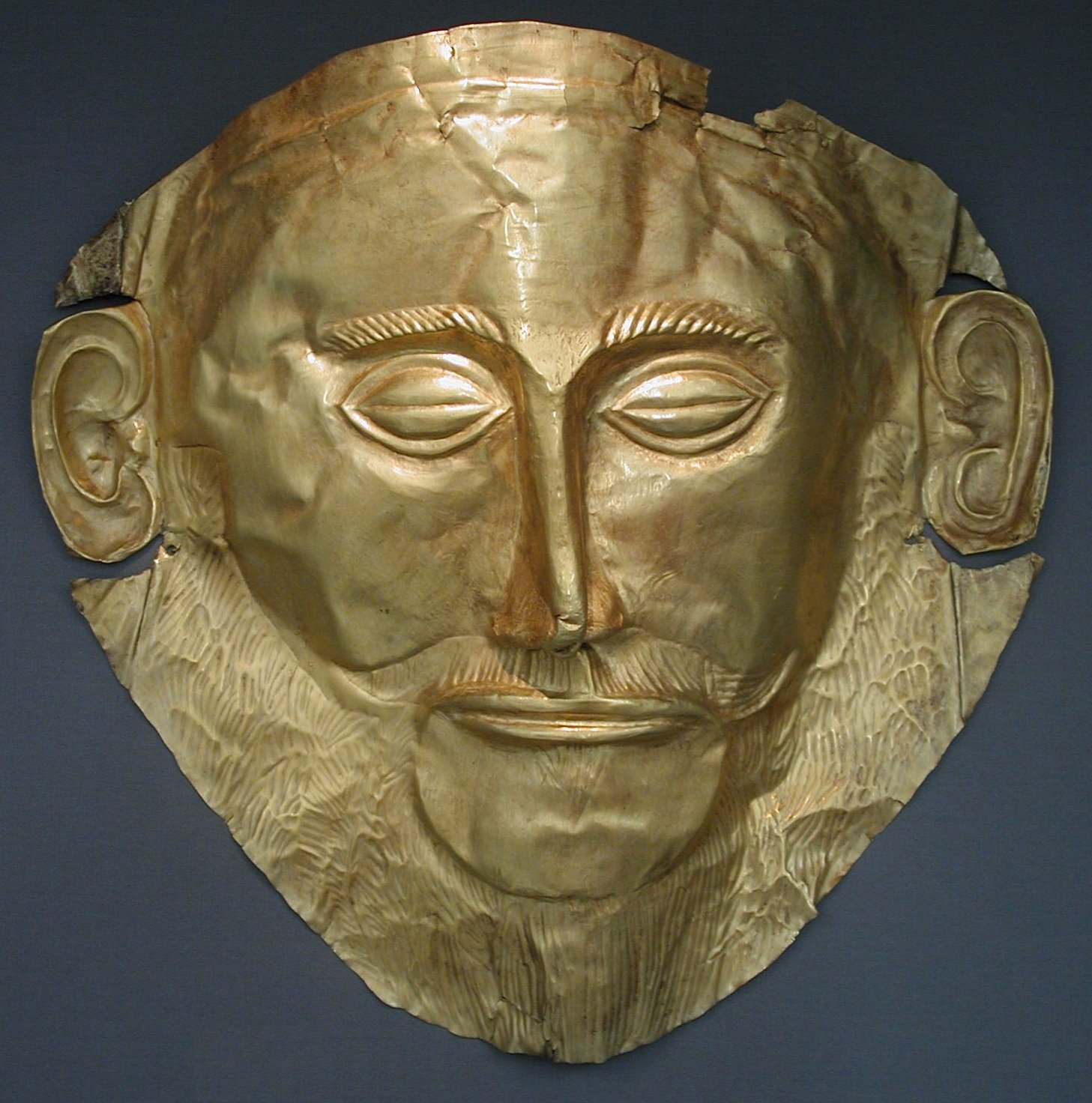
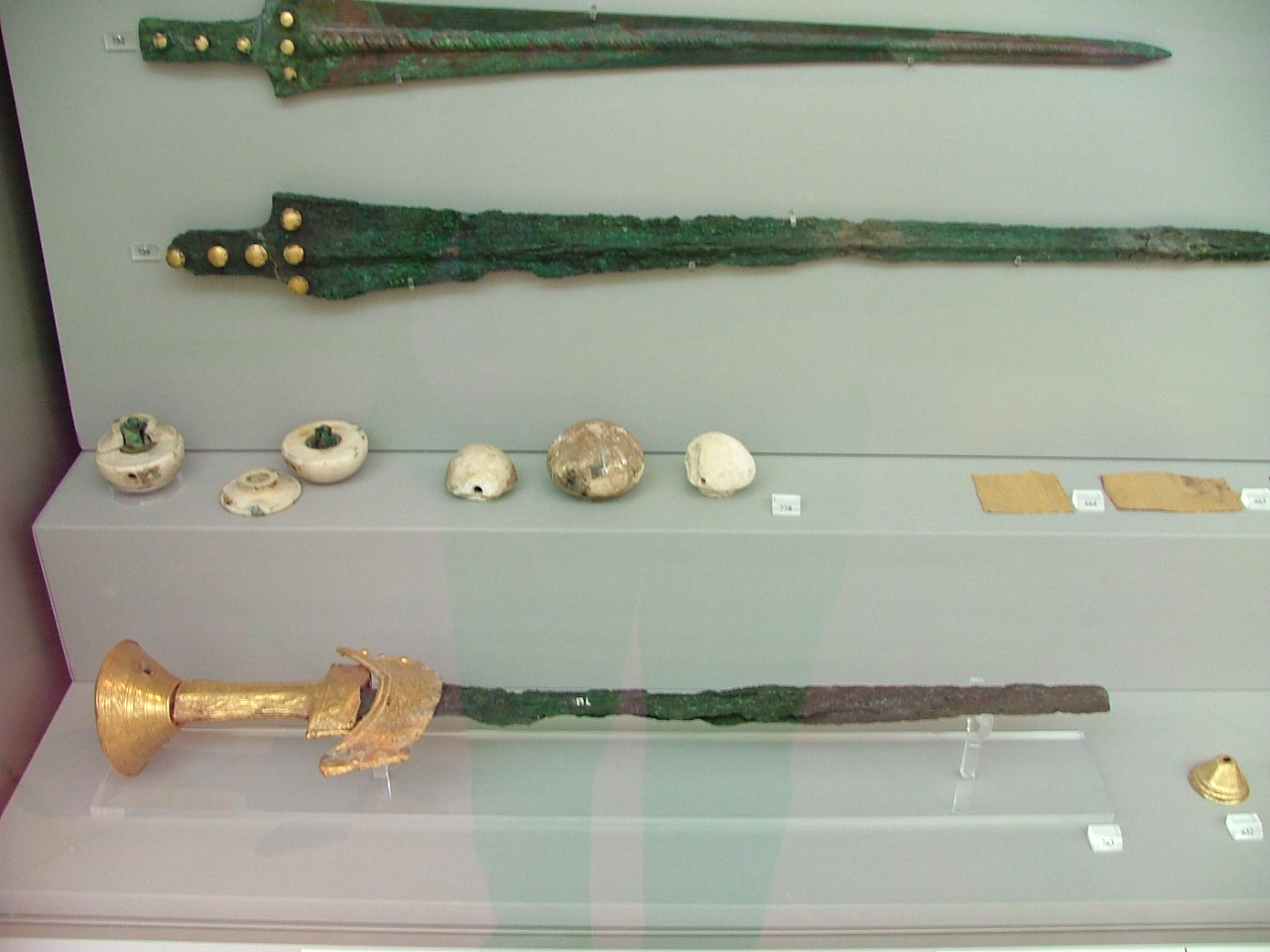
'Mask of Agamemnon' (left) and set of swords (right), Grave V.
Ring with "Battle in the Glen" scene

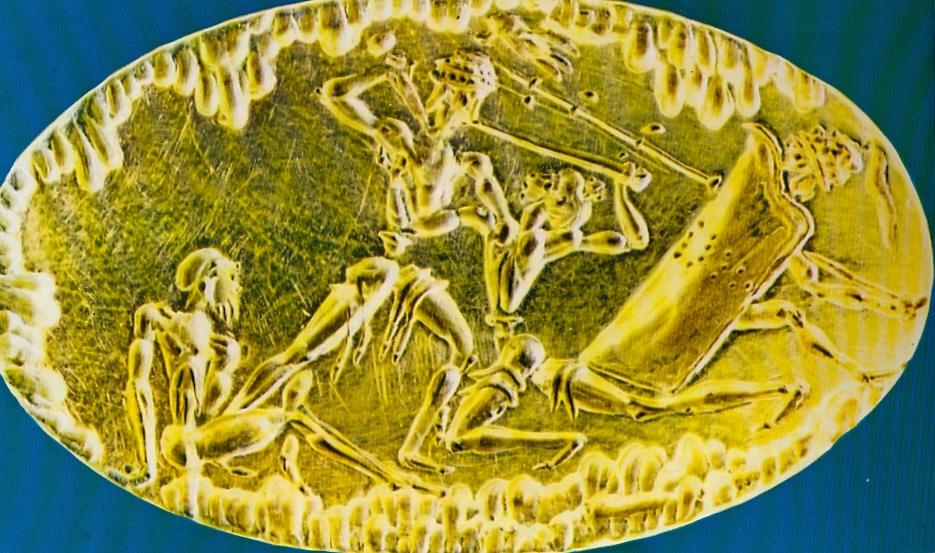
The ring in the National Archaeological Museum of Athens

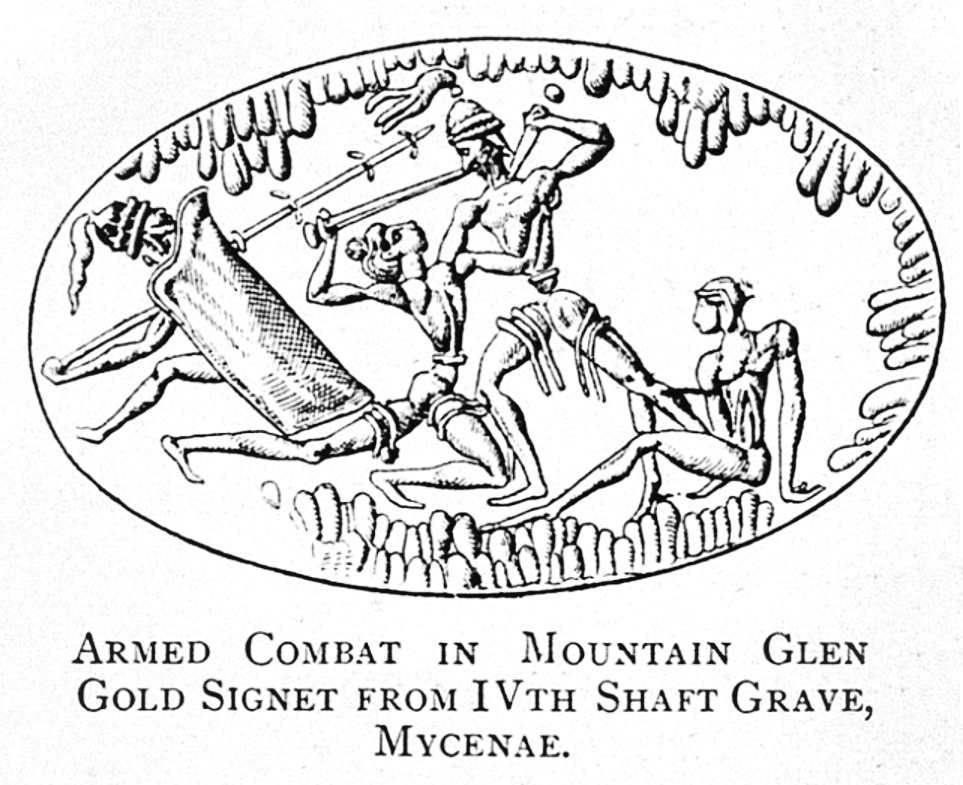
Drawing of the so-called Battle in the Glen ring.

Grave Circle A, with a diameter of 27.5 m (90 ft), is situated on the acropolis of Mycenae southeast of the Lion Gate. The Grave Circle contains six shaft graves, the smallest of which is measured at 3.0 m by 3.5 m and the largest measured at 4.50 m by 6.40 m (the depth of each shaft grave ranges from 1.0 m to 4.0 m). Over each grave, a mound was constructed, and stelae were erected. These stelae had been probably erected in memory of the Mycenaean rulers buried there; three of them depict chariot scenes.

A total of nineteen bodies – eight men, nine women, and two children – were found in the shafts. The shafts contained two to five bodies each, except for Grave II, which was a single burial. Between Graves IV and V, five golden masks were unearthed, including the Mask of Agamemnon discovered in Grave V. Boars' tusks were found in Grave IV. Additionally, gold and silver cups were discovered, including the Silver Siege Rhyton. Several gold rings, buttons, and bracelets were also found. Most of the graves were equipped with full sets of weapons, especially swords, and the figural depictions of the objects show fighting and hunting scenes. The gender of those entombed here were distinguished based on the grave goods that they were buried with them. Men were found with weapons while women received jewelry.

Many objects were designed to signify the social ranking of the deceased, for instance, decorated daggers, which were art objects and cannot be considered real weapons. Ornate staffs, as well as a scepter from Grave IV, clearly indicate a very significant status of the deceased. Items such as bulls' heads with a double-axe display clear Minoan influences. At the time that the Grave Circle was built, the Mycenaeans had not yet conquered Minoan Crete. Although it seems that they recognized the Minoans as the providers of the finest design and craftsmanship, most of the objects buried in Grave Circle A were decorated in the Minoan style. On the other hand, specific motifs such as fighting and hunting scenes are clearly of Mycenaean style. The combination of luxury goods found at this site represented many different societies of the time. This was an example of an "international style," which means countries would use the basic technology of one society and modify it to fit the standard imagery of their society.

== Excavations ==
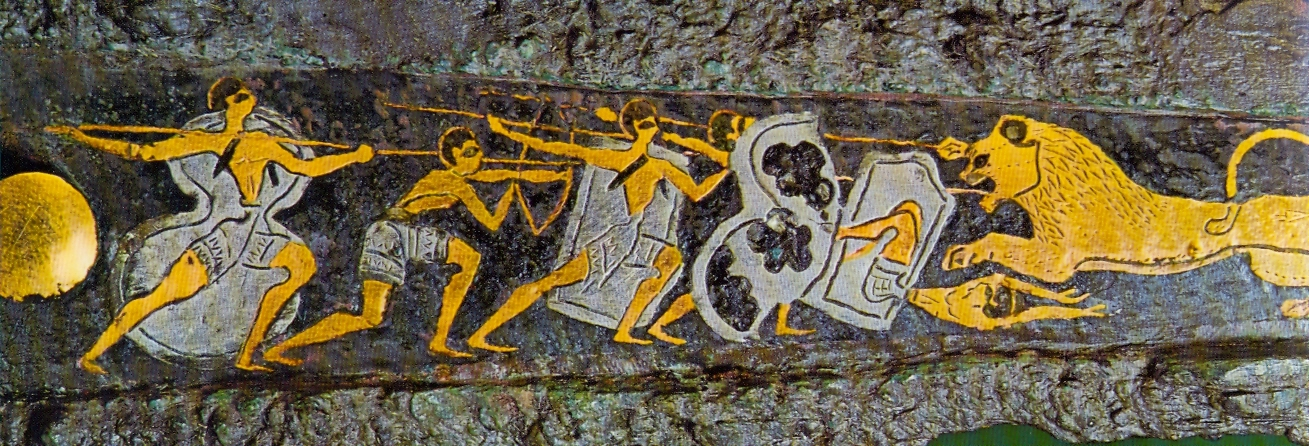
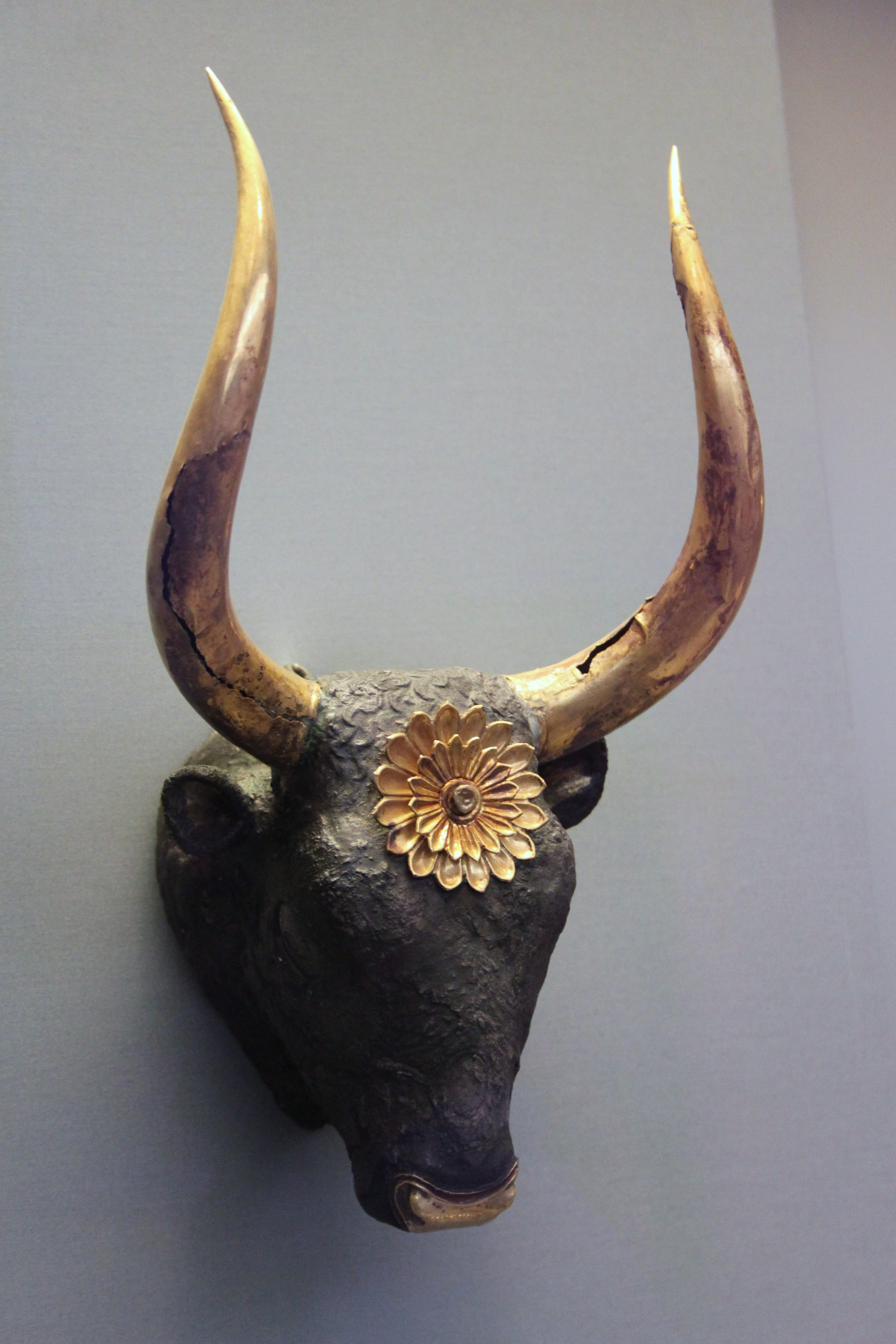
Hunting scene on the Lion Hunt Dagger blade (left) and bull's head (right), Grave IV.

The site of Mycenae was the first in Greece to be subjected to a modern archaeological excavation. The German archaeologist Heinrich Schliemann excavated it in 1876 along with Panagiotis Stamatakis, a Greek archaeologist appointed to supervise the excavations. Schliemann, inspired by Homer’s descriptions in the Iliad, in which Mycenae is termed "abounding in gold," began digging there. He was also following the accounts of the ancient geographer Pausanias who described the once-prosperous site and mentioned that, according to a local tradition during the 2nd century AD, the grave of Agamemnon included his followers, his charioteer Eurymedon, and the two children of Cassandra, all of whom were buried within the citadel. What Schliemann discovered in his excavation satisfied both his opinion of Homer's historical accuracy and his craving for valuable treasures. Among the objects he unearthed in Grave Circle A was a series of gold death masks, including one he proclaimed "The Death Mask of Agamemnon." Schliemann cleared five shafts and recognized them as the graves mentioned by Pausanias. He stopped after the fifth grave was excavated entirely, believing that he had finished exploring the Grave Circle. However, a year later, Stamatakis found a sixth shaft grave.

It has since been demonstrated that the burials in Grave Circle A date from 16th century BC, before the traditional time of the Trojan War (13th-12th century BC), in which Agamemnon is supposed to have participated.

== See also ==
- Grave stelai from Grave Circle A, Mycenae
- Gold grave goods at Grave Circles A and B
- Mycenaean Collections in the National Archaeological Museum of Athens
