= Shaft tomb =

Type of burial

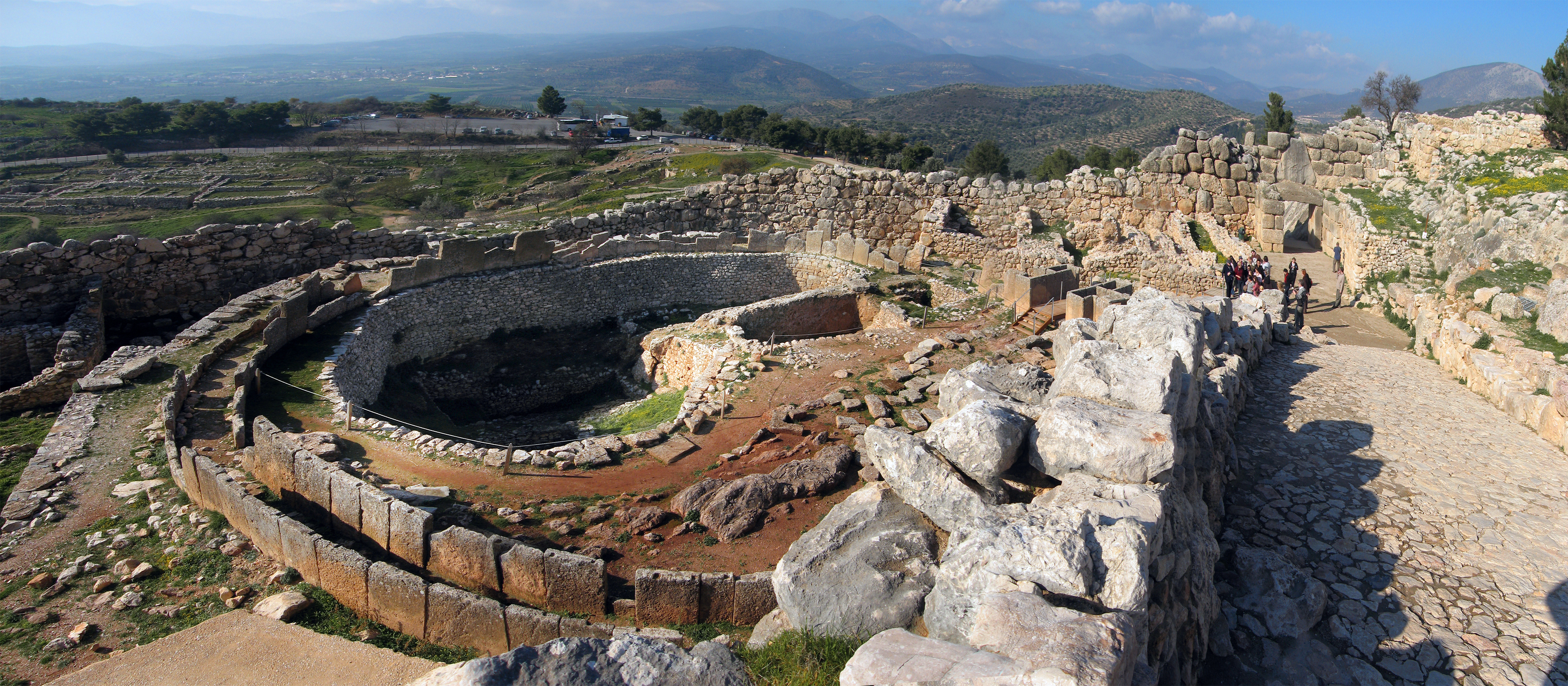
Mycenaean shaft tombs at Grave Circle A, Mycenae, 16th century BCE in Argolis, Greece, the resting place of the Mycenaean ruling families

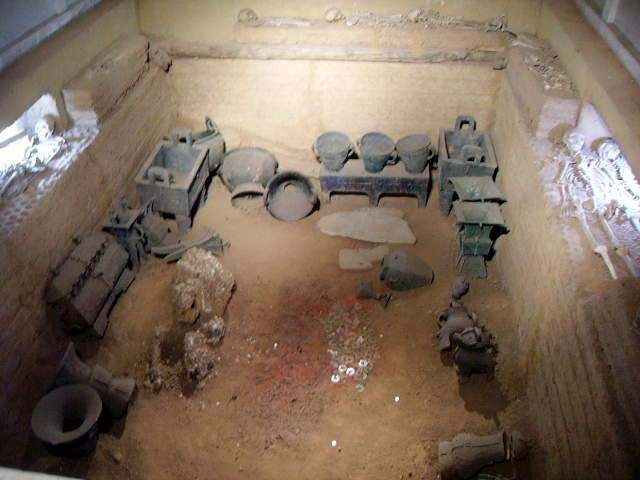
The burial pit shaft tomb of the Tomb of Lady Fu Hao, 1200 BCE Shang dynasty, the wife and queen of Chinese general, Fu Hao and King Wu Ding in Anyang, Henan Province, China

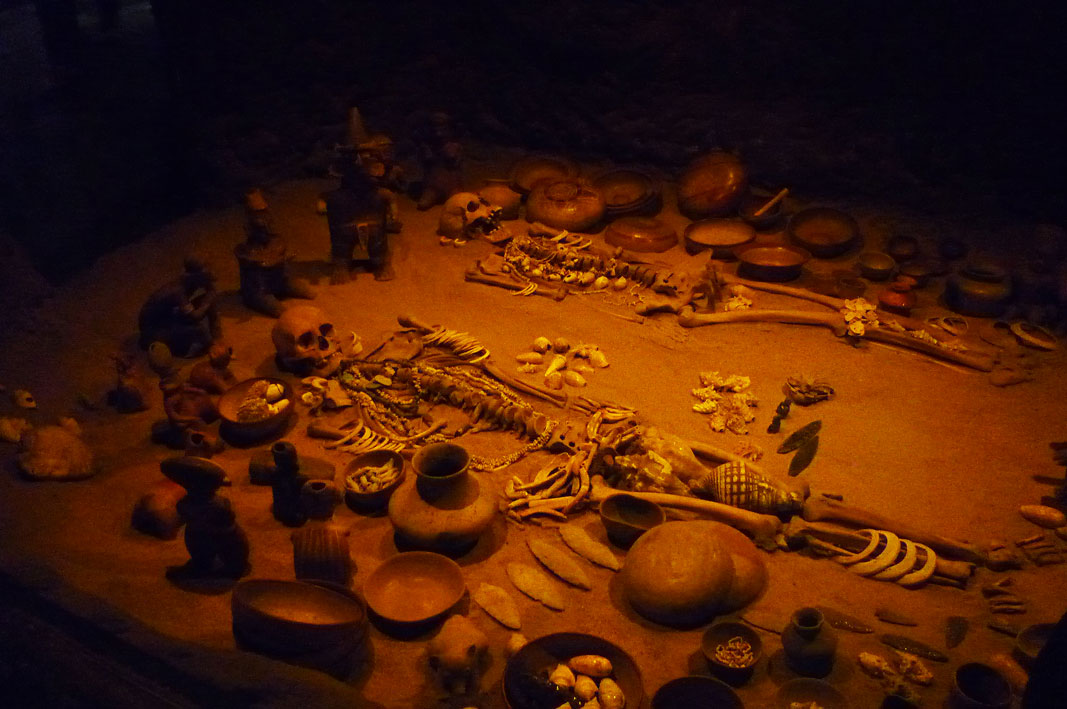
A shaft tomb exhibit of the Western Mexico shaft tomb culture, 300 BCE and 400 CE at the Museo Nacional de Antropología e Historia, México

A shaft tomb or shaft grave is a type of deep rectangular burial structure, similar in shape to the much shallower cist grave, containing a floor of pebbles, walls of rubble masonry, and a roof constructed of wooden planks.

== Practice ==
The practice of digging shaft tombs was a widespread phenomenon with prominent examples found in Mycenaean Greece; in Bronze Age China; and in Mesoamerican Western Mexico.

In the Neolithic period Epirus was populated by seafarers along the coast and by shepherds and hunters from the southwestern Balkans who brought with them the Proto-Greek language. These people buried their leaders in large mounds containing shaft graves. Similar burial chambers were subsequently used by the Mycenaean civilization, suggesting that the founders of Mycenae may have come from Epirus and central Albania. Epirus itself remained culturally backward during this time, but Mycenaean remains have been found at two religious shrines of great antiquity in the region: the Oracle of the Dead on the Acheron River, familiar to the heroes of Homer's Odyssey, and the Oracle of Zeus at Dodona, to whom Achilles prayed in the Iliad.

=== Mycenaean Greece ===
Mycenaean shaft graves originated and evolved from rudimentary Middle Helladic cists, tumuli, and tholos tombs with features derived from Early Bronze Age traditions developed locally in mainland Bronze Age Greece 16th century BCE. Middle Helladic burials would ultimately serve as the basis for the royal Shaft Graves containing a variety of grave goods, which signified the elevation of a native Greek-speaking royal dynasty whose economic power depended on long-distance sea trade.

The depth of Mycenaean shaft tombs would range from 1 to 4 m (3 to 13 ft) with a mound constructed for each grave and stelae erected. Archaeological examples include Grave Circle A and Grave Circle B.

=== Bronze Age China ===
Shaft graves were used by elites from the Shang dynasty (or Yin dynasty) during the Bronze Age 1200 BCE of northern China.

=== Mesoamerican Western Mexico ===
The Western Mexico shaft tomb tradition or shaft tomb culture refers to a set of interlocked cultural traits found in the present day western Mexican states of Jalisco, Nayarit, and, to a lesser extent, Colima to its south, roughly dating to the period between 300 BCE and 400 CE. An example is the La Campana archaeological site of the Capacha and subsequent cultures.

== See also ==
- Grave Circle A, Mycenae
- Grave Circle B, Mycenae
- Grave field
- Ixtlán del Rio (archaeological site)
- Shaft and chamber tomb
- Western Mexico shaft tomb tradition
