= Gold grave goods at Grave Circles A and B =

Gold grave goods in the Bronze Age city of Mycenae, Greece

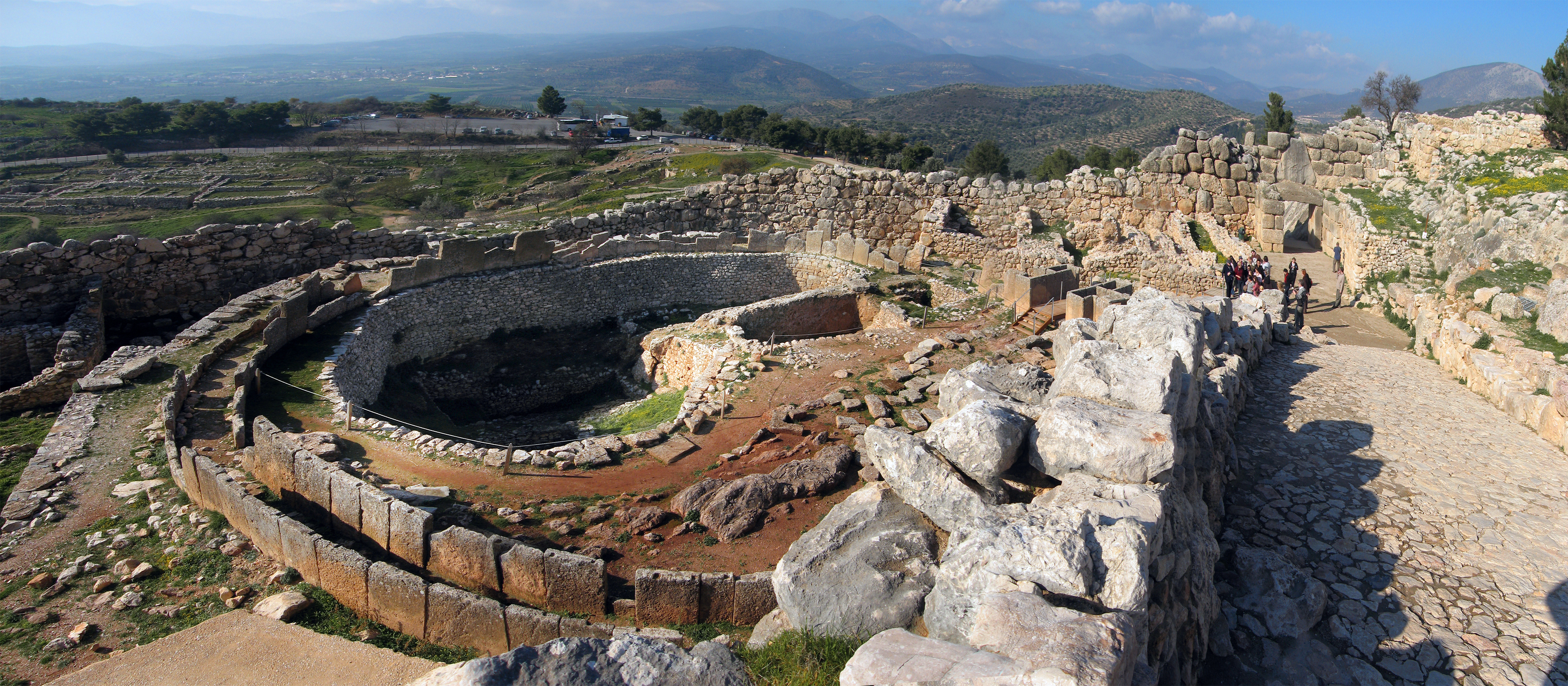
Grave Circle A, Mycenae

There have been many discoveries of gold grave goods at Grave Circles A and B in the Bronze Age city of Mycenae. Gold has always been used to show status amongst the deceased when used in grave goods. While there's evidence that the practice of grave goods and monumentalizing graves to show status was used throughout Ancient Greece from the Bronze Age and passed through the Classical Period, the goods themselves changed over time. However, using gold as a material was a constant status marker. At the Grave Circles in Mycenae, there were several grave goods found that were made out of gold; masks, cups, swords, jewelry, and more. Because there were so many gold grave goods found at this site there's a legend of Golden Mycenae. Each family group would add ostentatious grave goods to compete with the other family groups for who is the wealthiest. There was more gold found at Grave Circle A and B than in all of Crete before the late Bronze Age.

In many portable forms of art, and for painting, the Mycenaeans relied on the Minoan art of Crete, which probably sometimes reached them in the form of imported objects, sometimes by imported artists and trainers of Greek artists. For Sinclair Hood, these objects (specifically those from Circle A) "raise in an acute form the related questions of how to distinguish mainland from Cretan work, and the significance of any distinction that may exist".

== Masks and cups ==
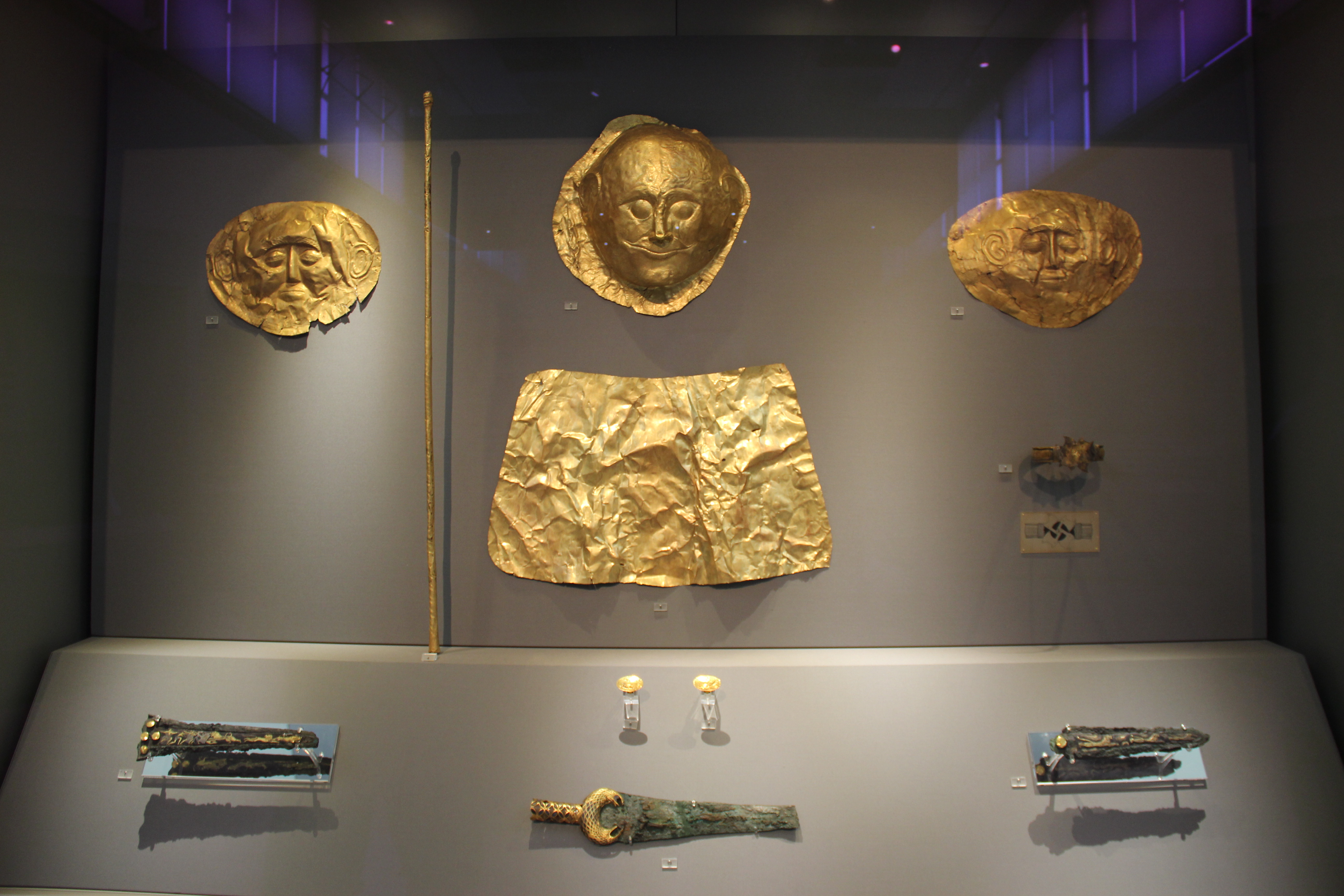
Several Mycenaean gold funerary masks in the National Archaeological Museum, Athens

Heinrich Schliemann, a German archaeologist, excavated Mycenae in 1876. Of the six shaft graves in Grave Circle A, the "Mask of Agamemnon" was found in Grave V. In addition, six of the men found in the shafts of Grave Circle A were given gold masks, and then one child who was also found with a suit of gold had a gold mask. There were 7 skulls found in Grave Circle B that, when facially reconstructed, had several similarities between them that led scholars to believe the faces were related. This suggest that there were different families buried in Grave Circle A, and that each wanted to boast their wealth and success over the other family. To make these masks they took crude gold and beat them into the shapes they wanted using a technique called repoussé. The gold vessels found, mostly cups, were clear examples of status symbols. The craftsmen of the gold vessels also used repoussé, which would require more work than a regular vessel. There was one specific gold cup found in Grave Circle A that resembles Nestor's Cup from Homer's Iliad. Even in death, families used gold for conspicuous displays of wealth.

== Jewelry and weapons ==
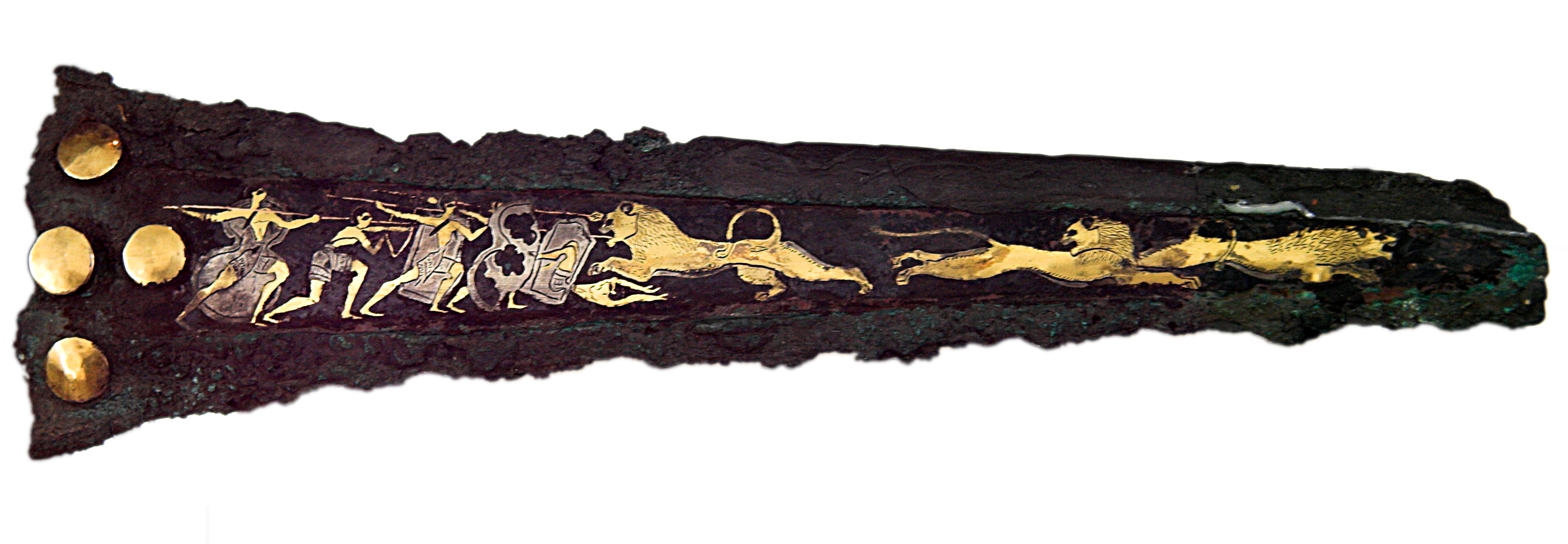
A gold dagger

The grave goods generally marked the difference between men and women. Women were found with gold jewelry, shrouds, and gold ornaments for dresses while men were found with gold masks, daggers, and swords. Several of the women's graves had gold diadems in them, and they were so fragile that the only use for them would be grave goods. All of these decorative gold grave goods were meant to be a sort of "status uniform" to distinguish their place in the community. For the most part these weapons were made to be art, and not used for battle. While there were some daggers in Grave Circle B, the majority of them came from Grave Circle A. Many of the daggers were actually made of bronze, but inlaid with gold using a Syrian technique called niello. One of the daggers found in Grave IV in Grave Circle A depicted a lion hunt, which may represent another status marker as the lion hunt was a motif that connected power and leadership. The dagger also contained certain aspects like the hunters wearing tall oxhide shields that were common in Greek frescoes. Another object found in shaft grave IV is a bull's head rhyton with gold horns and embellishments. Worshipping a bull was more of a Cretan practice, so this grave good implies influence of Cretan culture amongst the families in Mycenae.

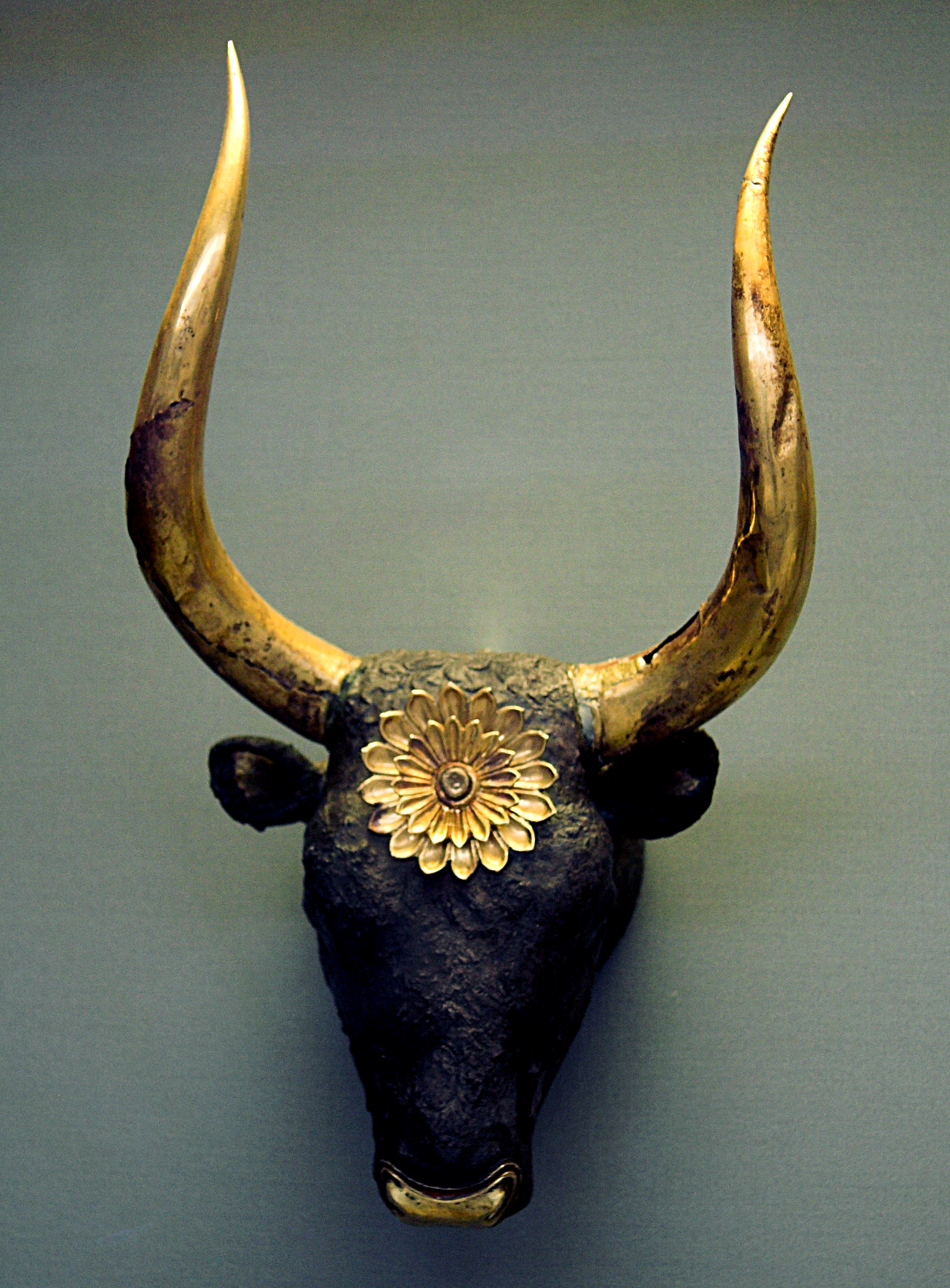
Rhyton bull's head

== Differences between Grave Circles A and B ==
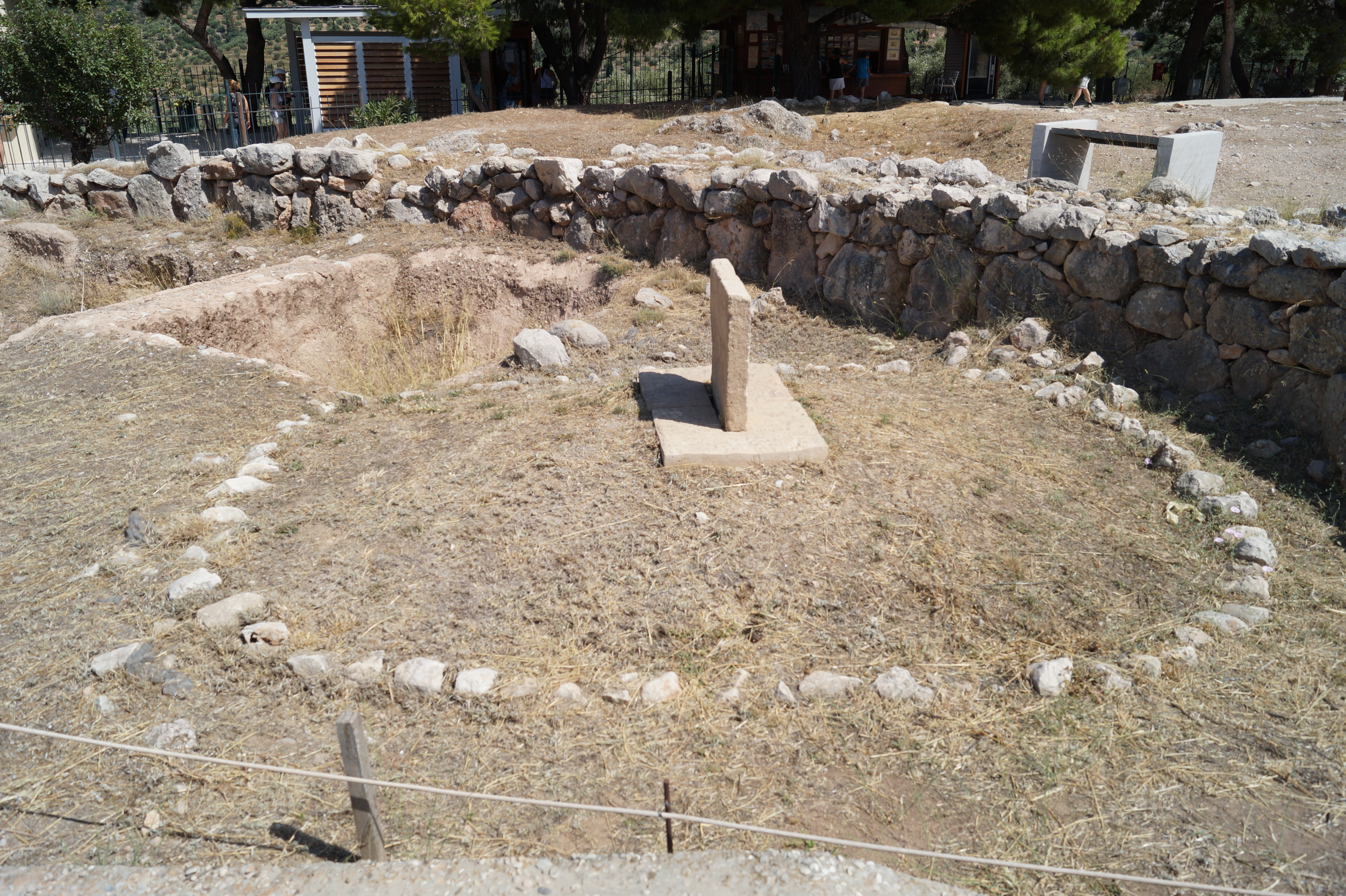
Grave circle B 3

The amount of luxury items found in both of the Mycenae Grave Circles was a true phenomenon. There are some scholars who believe that graves in the two Grave Circles represent two royal lines because the grave goods were of such high quality, but it has never been more than a speculation. Combined, the graves contained 5 generations over the years 1650-1500 BC, but Grave Circle B was started around 50 years before Grave Circle A. The majority found there were weapons and gold ornaments, and then the masks. Overall, the biggest difference between the gold grave goods is just that there are more found at Grave Circle A, but both of them show the amount of wealth that was abundant in Mycenae during the Bronze Age. It has been estimated that Circle A contained about 15 kilos of gold in total (not all of high purity); a considerable quantity, but a good deal less than in just the inner coffin of Tutankhamun. The family groups that attributed to these graves made sure that those who died carried their status with them into death, and the use of gold was so ostentatious it brought even more attention to them.
