= Grave Circle B, Mycenae =

Grave Circle B
- Ταφικός περίβολος Β' (Greek)
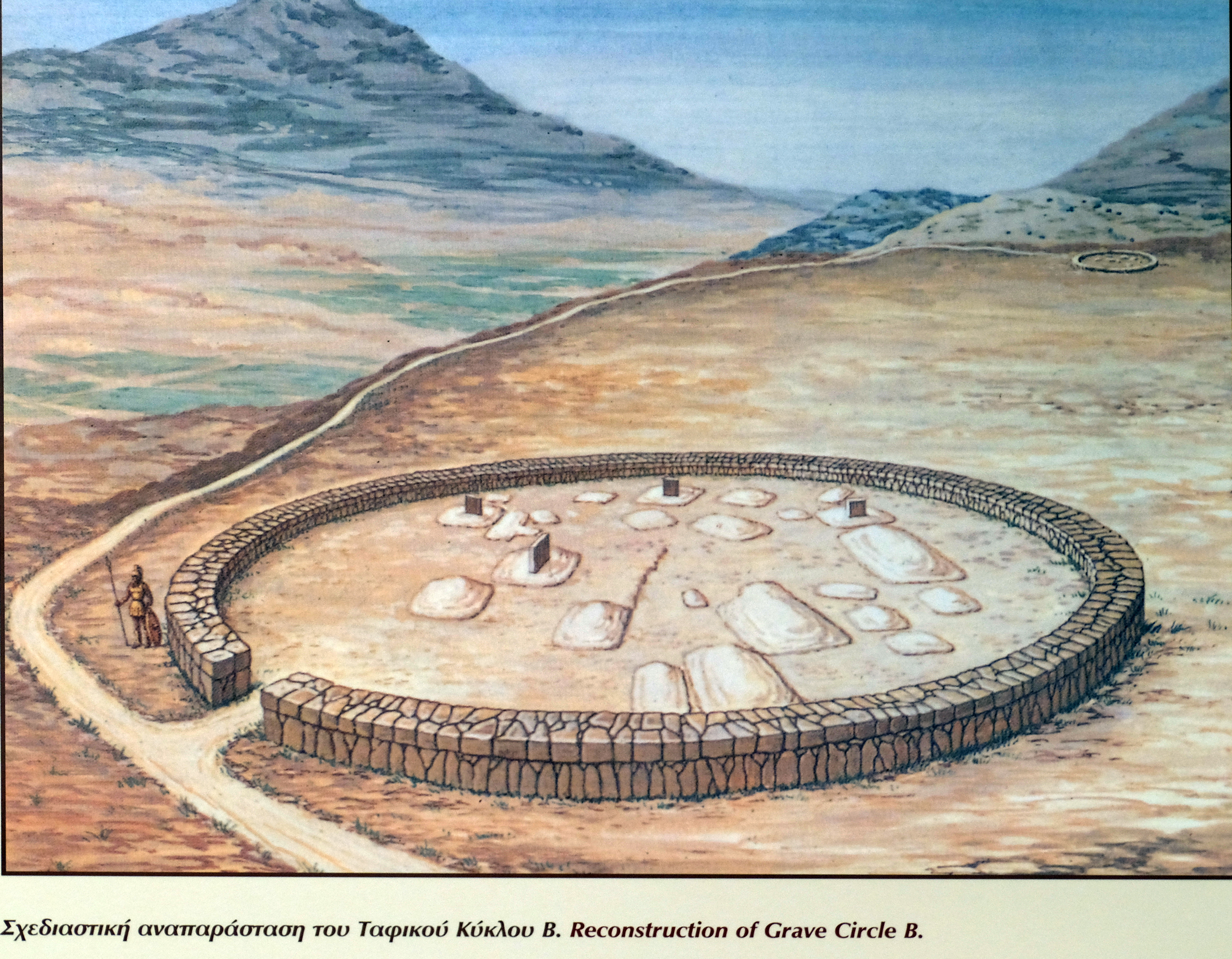
- Grave Circle B (right) and the main entrance of the citadel (left)

- Location within Greece
- 37°43′51″N 22°45′18″E
- Location: Mycenae

History
- Formed: ca. 1675/1650–1550 BCE
- Built for: Burial place of the Mycenaean ruling families

Site notes
- Area: Argolis, Greece

Grave Circle B in Mycenae is a 17th–16th century BCE royal cemetery situated outside the late Bronze Age citadel of Mycenae, southern Greece. This burial complex was constructed outside the fortification walls of Mycenae and together with Grave Circle A represent one of the major characteristics of the early phase of the Mycenaean civilization.

== Structure ==
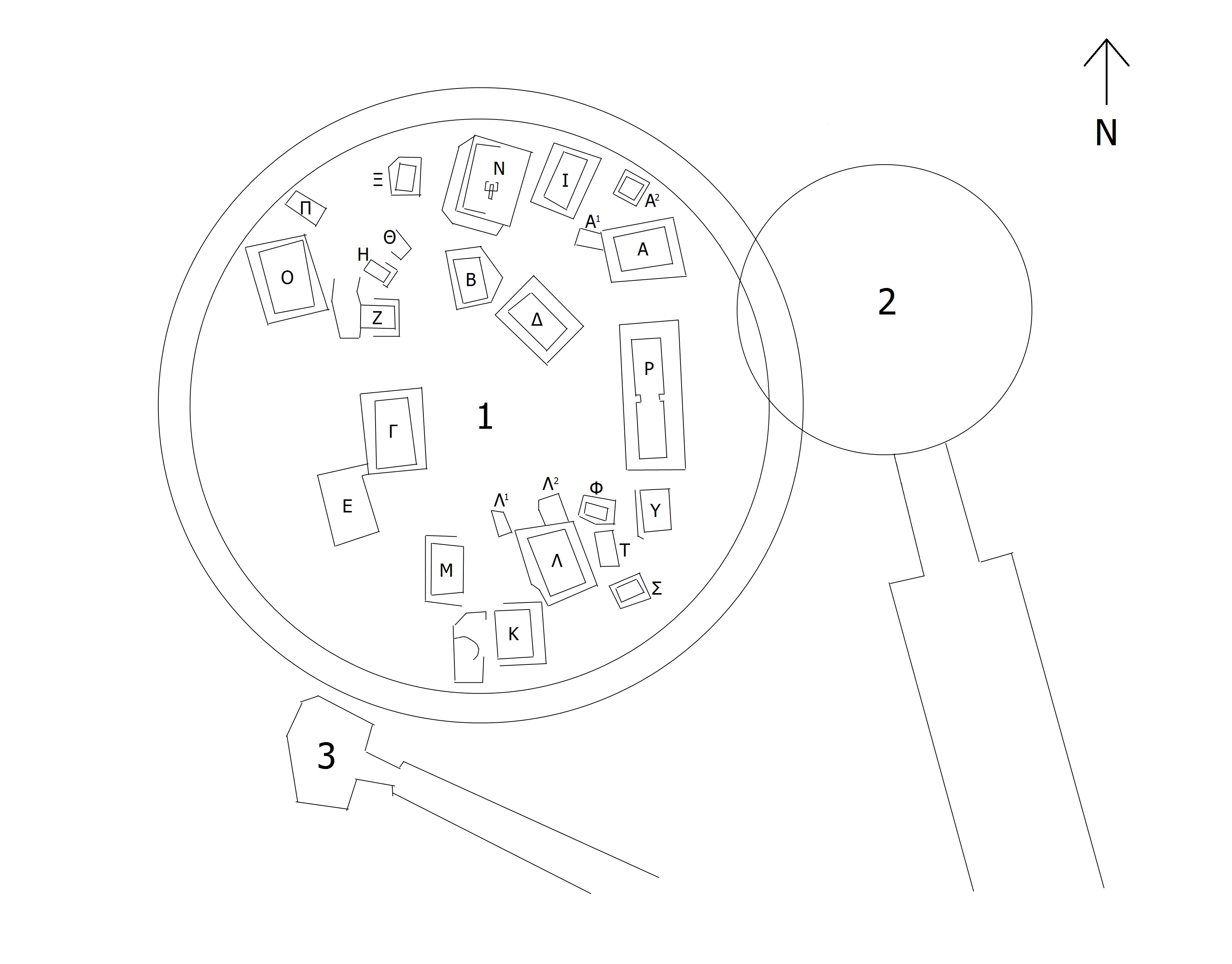
Plan of Grave Circle B: 1. Grave circle B, 2. Tomb of Clytemnestra, 3. Chamber grave outside of grave circle

Grave Circle B, with a diameter of 28 m (92 ft), is situated at a distance of 117 m (384 ft) west of the Lion Gate, the main entrance of Mycenae. The burial structure was enclosed by a circular stone wall, 1.55 m (5 ft) thick and 1.20 m (4 ft) high. The Circle hosts a total of 26 graves; 14 of which are shaft graves and the rest simple cists. A total of 24 persons were found in the shafts, while six of the shaft graves were family tombs in which several occupants were found.

Most shafts were marked by a pile of stones and on four of them stelae were erected. The latter were up to 2 m (7 ft) high. Two of the stelae, on graves Alpha and Gamma, were engraved with hunting scenes.

== History ==
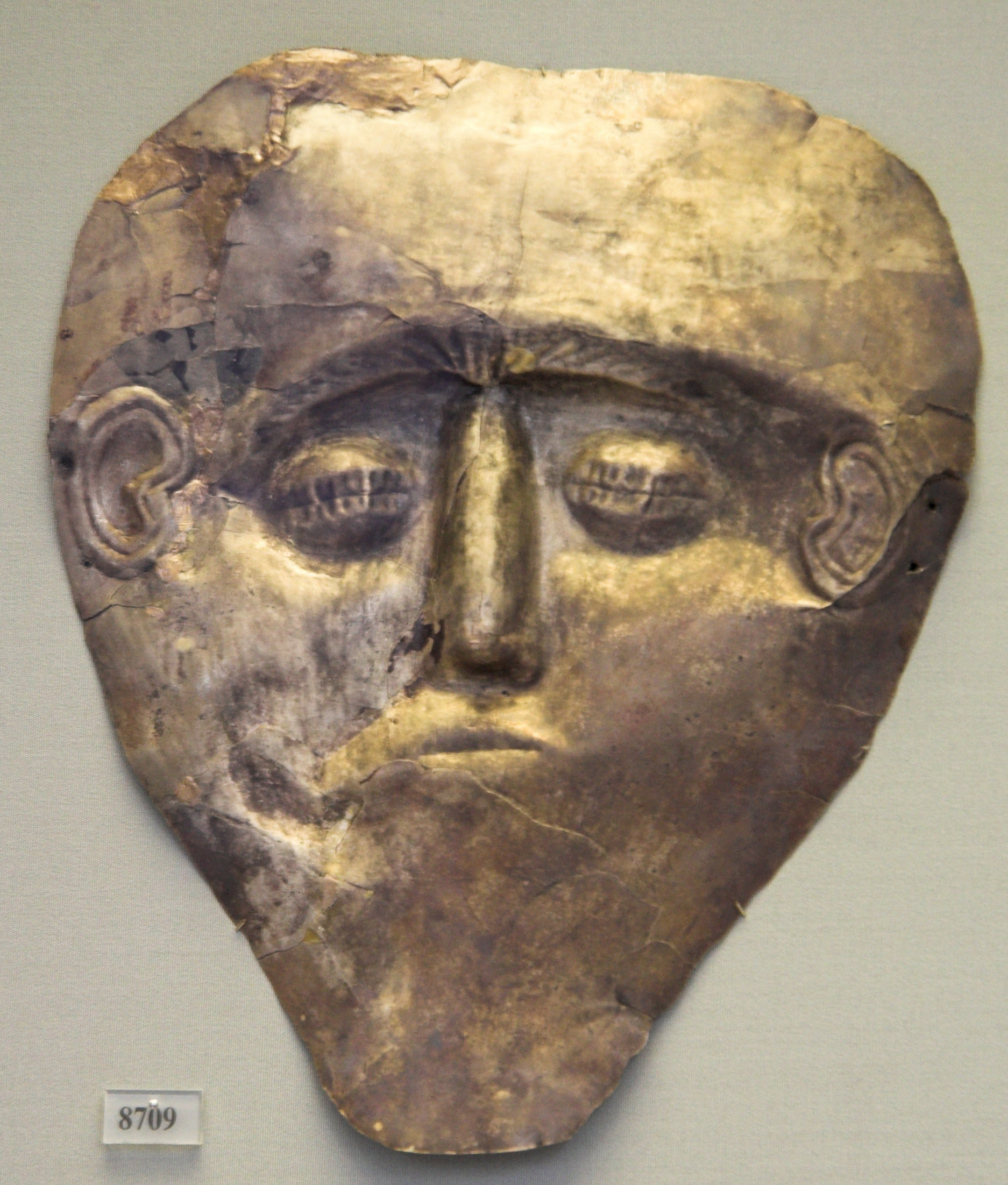
Death mask made of electrum, shaft grave "Gamma"

Mycenaean shaft graves are essentially an Argive variant of the rudimentary Middle Helladic funerary tradition with features derived from Early Bronze Age traditions developed locally in mainland Greece. During the first phase of use of the Grave Circle, the interments were typical of the burials of that period; they were small and shallow with small and poor goods found next to the deceased. The graves became gradually larger, richer and more numerous in goods, while female burials were also introduced. Moreover, diadems were found in both sexes and in all the age groups buried. The number of ornaments was also considerably increased and especially associated with female burials. An additional new feature was that half of the graves, regardless of the sex of the deceased, were equipped with imports from the nearby Cyclades islands. The number of imports continues to grow steadily in the early Late Helladic period (ca. 1600–1550 BCE), while the first objects of Cretan origin make also their appearance.

At its latest phase of use, more women than men are buried in the Circle, while the male burials appear to be relatively poor compared to the female ones. Male burials are associated with sets of tableware, usually drinking vessels and their military force is stressed by weapons of various types. This points to the emergence of an elite warrior class in Mycenaean society.

Meanwhile, Grave Circle A, a new elite burial place of similar architecture was found nearby, which seems to be a continuation Circle B. Thus, the latest graves of Circle B (Alpha, Gamma, Delta, Epsilon and Omikron) were contemporary with the earliest of Circle A.

== Findings ==
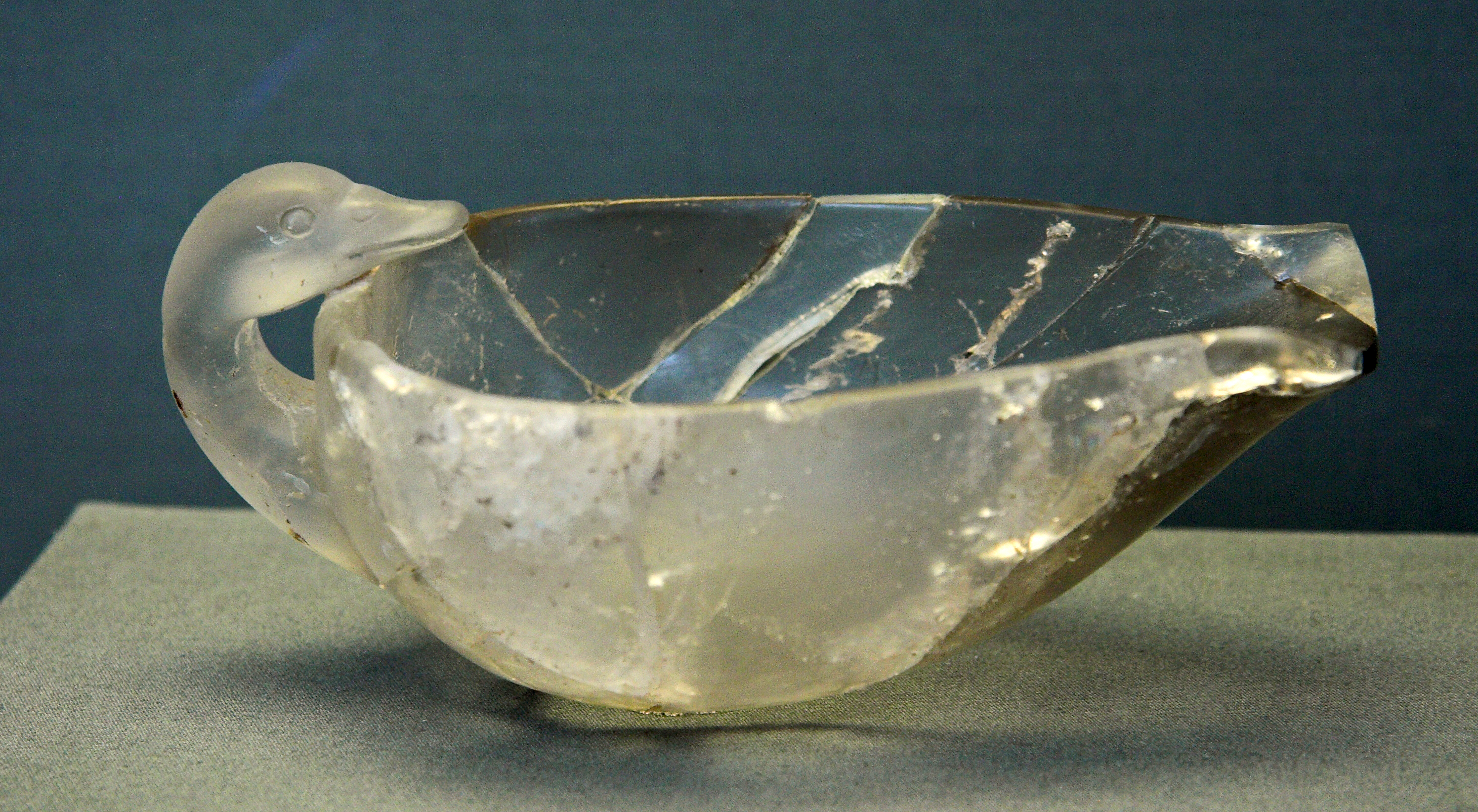
Crystal duck-shaped bowl, shaft grave "Omikron"

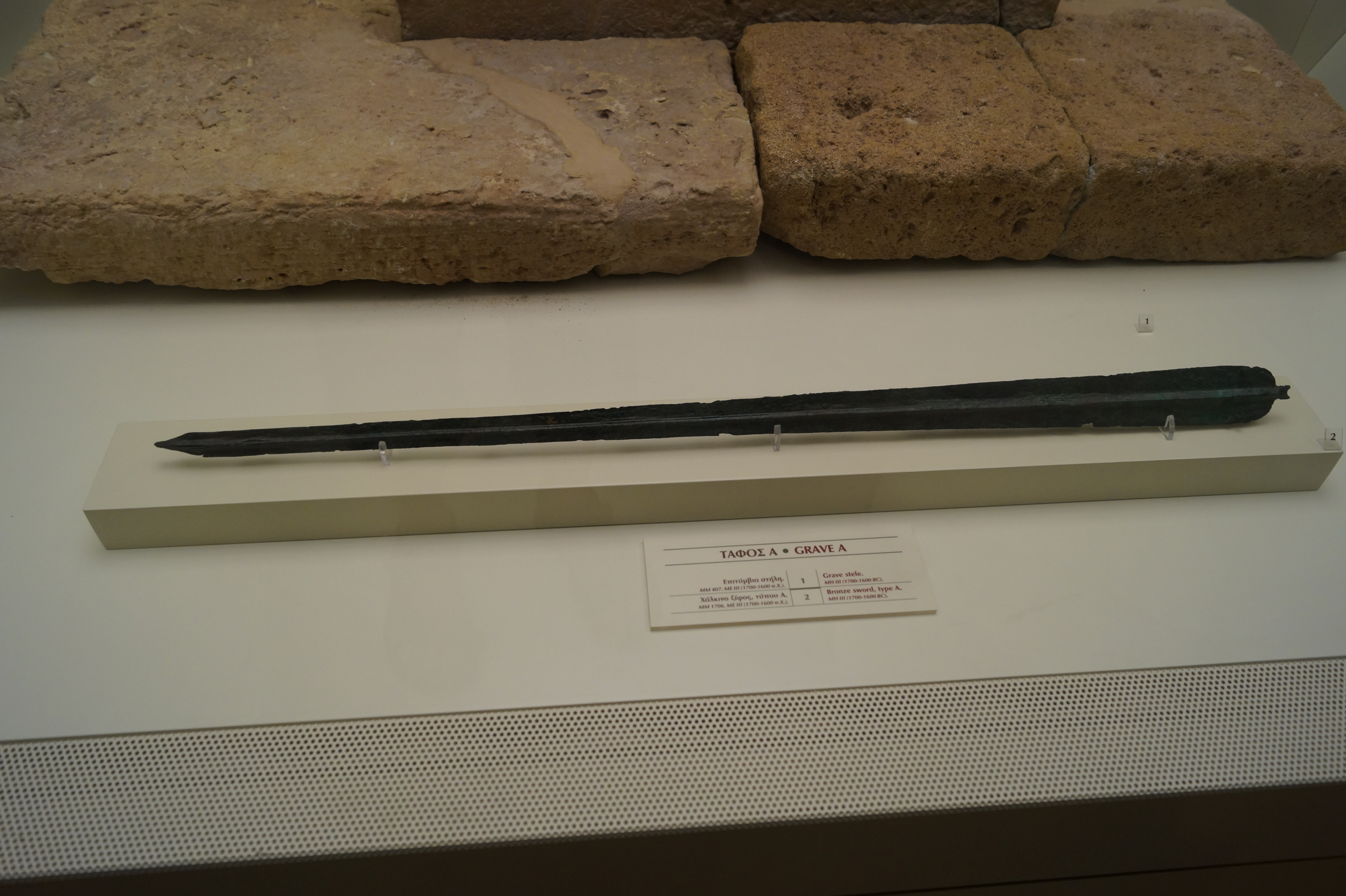
Bronze sword, shaft grave A

The graves were not looted in antiquity as happened to other monuments such as the latter (15th–12th century BCE) Mycenaean tholoi tombs. The women in the graves were richly dressed and decorated with various ornaments, such as earrings, necklaces, bands of gold and silver pins. On the other hand, swords, daggers and arrowheads were found next to the deceased males and their clothing was trimmed with gold. In grave Nu, traces of a boar's tusk helmet, typical of Mycenaean warfare, were recovered.

A death mask of electrum has been also unearthed. However, it wasn't found on the face of the deceased male, but in a wooden box next to him. On the other hand, the burial costumes differed from those of Grave Circle A. The latter included death masks of different artistic style and made of gold, like the Mask of Agamemnon.

== Excavations ==
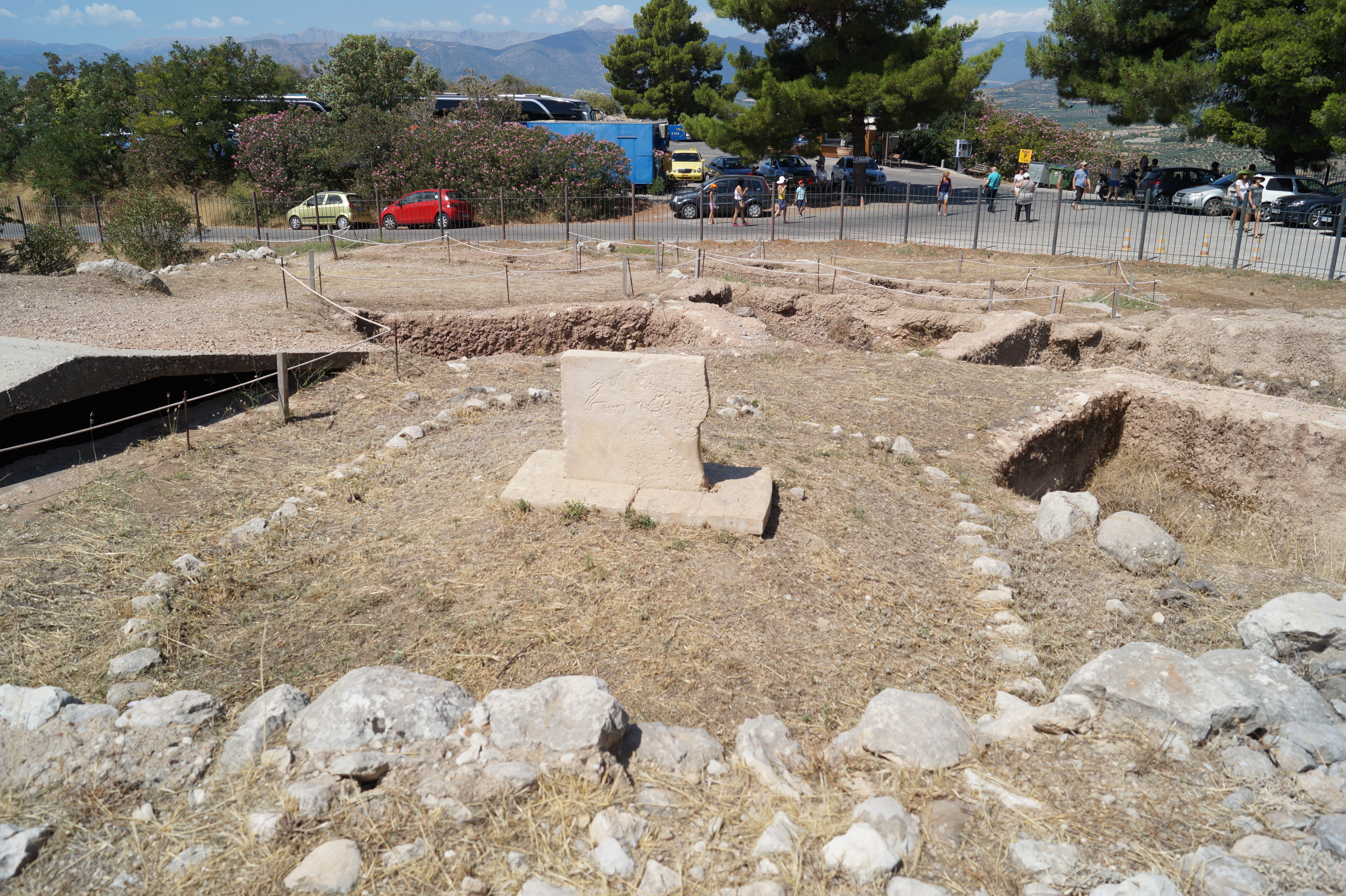
Grave Circle B

The burial complex was discovered in 1951 by accident, when workmen were digging at a nearby 13th century BCE tholos tomb, known as the Tomb of Clytemnestra. Extensive excavations were conducted by archaeologists Ioannis Papadimitriou and Georgios Mylonas in 1952 and lasted for two years. Each shaft grave was assigned a letter from the Greek alphabet, in order to be distinguished from the graves of Circle A, which bear Latin numbers.

This group of 26 graves can be dated into the late Middle Helladic through early Late Helladic period, in ca. 1675/1650–1550 BCE. Their exceptional number, as well as the fact that they were not looted, enabled the archaeologists to extract a detailed analysis of the ruling Mycenaean society of that time.

== Further research ==
The remains of the deceased found in the Grave Circle were generally in a good state of preservation and have been since extensively examined. Many of the males have signs of injury, probably received on the battlefield, while some of them died in battle.

Researchers from the University of Manchester have carried an ancient DNA study of 22 skeletons found in the site and obtained authentic mitochondrial ancient DNA sequences for four individuals. The results were also compared with facial reconstructions of the skulls and archaeological data. They have also concluded that two bodies from "Gamma" shaft, where the electrum death mask was found, were brother and sister. Based on this, it has been argued that both female and male family members, held a position of authority by right of birth.

== Sources ==
- Bouwman, Abigail S.; Brown, Keri A.; Prag, John N.W.; Brown, Terence A. (September 2008). "Kinship between burials from Grave Circle B at Mycenae revealed by ancient DNA typing". Journal of Archaeological Science. 35 (9): 2580–2584. Bibcode:2008JArSc..35.2580B. doi:10.1016/j.jas.2008.04.010.
- Budin, Stephanie Lynn (2009). The Ancient Greeks: An Introduction. Oxford: Oxford University Press. ISBN 978-0-19-537984-6.
- Castleden, Rodney (2005). Mycenaeans. London and New York: Routledge. ISBN 978-0-415-36336-5.
- Dickinson, Oliver (December 1999). "Invasion, Migration and the Shaft Graves". Bulletin of the Institute of Classical Studies. 43 (1): 97–107. doi:10.1111/j.2041-5370.1999.tb00480.x.
- Heitz, Christian (2008). "Burying the Palaces? Ideologies in the Shaft Grave Period" (PDF). University of Heidelberg: 1–38. doi:10.11588/propylaeumdok.00000089.
- Kershaw, Stephen (2010). A Brief History of Classical Civilization. London: Robinson. ISBN 9781849018005.
- Komita, Nobuo (1982). "The Grave Circles at Mycenae and the Early Indo-Europeans". Research Reports of Ikutoku Technical University (A-7): 59–70.
- Schofield, Louise (2007). The Mycenaeans. Los Angeles: The British Museum Press. ISBN 978-0-89-236867-9.
