= Theseus Ring =

Greek gold signet ring from the 15th century BC

- Material: Gold
- Height: 1.8 cm
- Width: 2.7 cm
- Created: c. 1450 BC
- Discovered: c. 1955; Athens, Greece
- Present location: National Archaeological Museum, Athens

The Theseus Ring is a gold signet ring that dates back to the 15th-century BC, in the Mycenaean period, though the subject is typical of Minoan art. The ring is gold and measures 2.7 x 1.8 cm. On the ring is a depiction of a bull-leaping scene, which includes a lion to the left and what may be a tree on the right. It comes from the area of Anafiotika in the Plaka, the ancient city center of Athens, where it was found in a pile of earth during building operations. It now belongs to the National Archaeological Museum of Athens. There is no assertion that the ring actually belonged to Theseus, whose myth includes a gold ring.

The authenticity of the Theseus Ring was debated after its discovery in the Plaka district of Athens in the 1950s. For a while it was dismissed as a fake, but as of 2006, the ring has been identified as an authentic 15th century BC artifact. The Greek press had reported the discovery of a gold signet ring, and the National Archaeological Museum of Athens wanted to purchase it for 75,000 euros from the woman who owned it. After an examination by a panel of experts at the Cultural Ministry, the piece was declared to be genuine.

== Origin of the name in legend ==
The ring was named the "Theseus Ring" because of an ancient Greek myth about Theseus. According to this story, there was a dispute between Minos and Theseus over the parentage of Theseus. In Crete, Minos molested one of the maidens and Theseus became angry and challenged him, boasting of his parentage by Poseidon. Minos, being the son of Zeus, did not believe that Theseus did indeed have divine parentage. Minos believed that if Theseus' father was in fact Poseidon, Theseus would have no difficulty reaching the bottom of the ocean. Minos threw a ring overboard and challenged Theseus to dive in and retrieve it. The fishes of the sea then took Theseus upon their backs and conveyed him to the palace of Amphitrite, Poseidon's wife. She handed Theseus the ring that had landed at the bottom of the ocean floor and also gave him a jeweled crown, which was later placed among the stars.
