= Silver Siege Rhyton =

16th-century BC Mycenaean rhyton

The Silver Siege Rhyton is a silver vessel discovered in Shaft Grave IV of Grave Circle A at Mycenae and is dated to c. 1600–1500 BCE, or during the Late Helladic I period. The rhyton was likely used for the transportation of libation for use in sacred ritual and is so named for its relief depicting an attack on a fortified town. The abundance of precious metalwork and weaponry both votive and practical discovered in Shaft Grave IV suggests that it was the burial place of a warrior chieftain or a member of his family.
