= Hellenization =

Spread of Greek language and culture

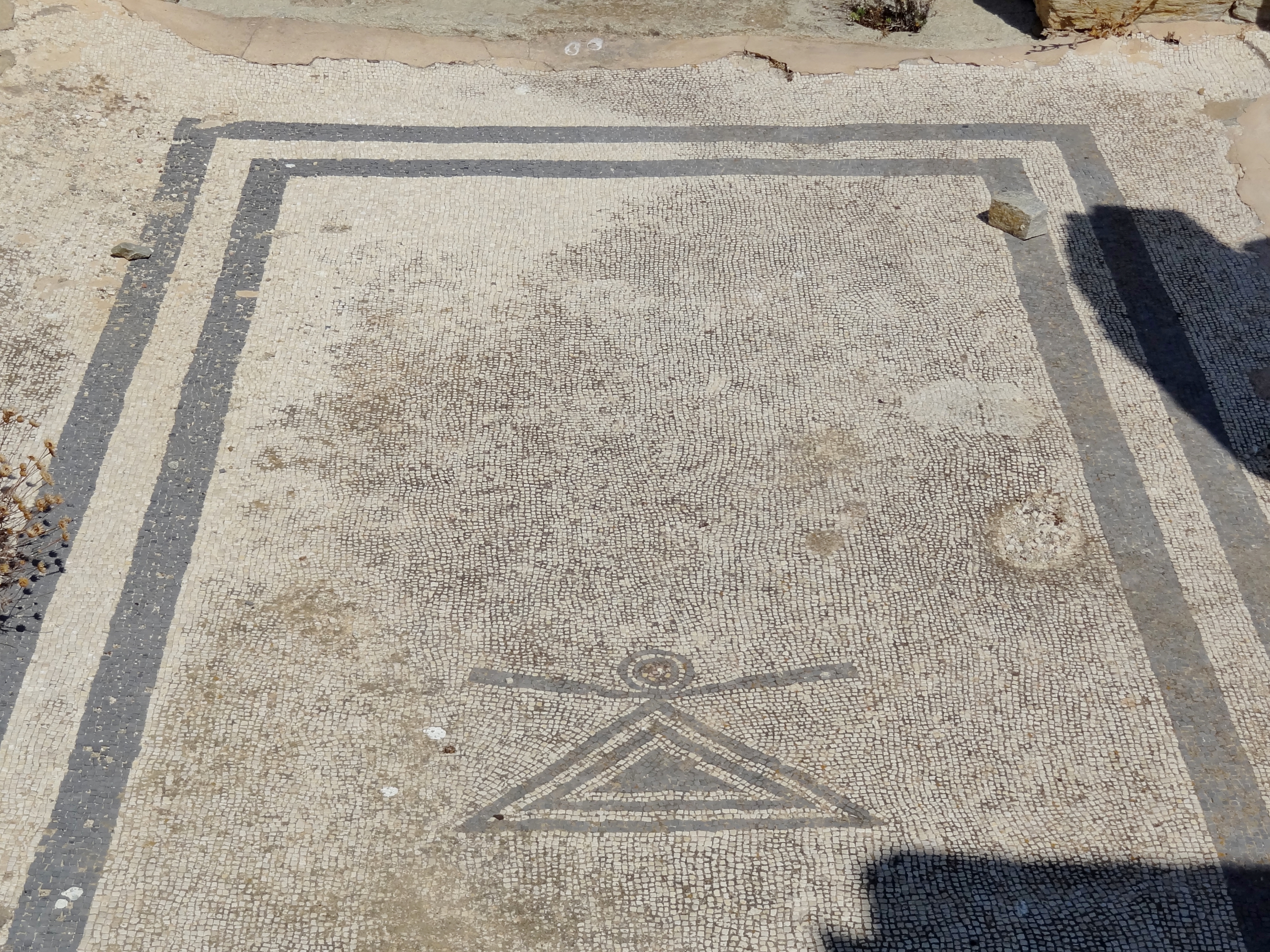
One of the mosaics of Delos, Greece with the symbol of the Punic-Phoenician goddess Tanit

Hellenization (Note: also spelled Hellenisation or Hellenism) or Hellenification is the adoption of Greek culture, religion, language, and identity by non-Greeks. In the ancient period, colonization often led to the Hellenization of indigenous people. In the Hellenistic period, many of the territories which were conquered by Alexander the Great were Hellenized.

== Etymology ==
The first known use of a verb that means "to Hellenize" was in Greek (ἑλληνίζειν) and by Thucydides (5th century BC), who wrote that the Amphilochian Argives were Hellenized as to their language by the Ambraciots, which shows that the word perhaps already referred to more than language. The similar word Hellenism, which is often used as a synonym, is used in 2 Maccabees (c. 124 BC) and the Book of Acts (c. AD 80–90) to refer to clearly much more than language, though it is disputed what that may have entailed.

The name of Greece differs in Greek compared with the names used for the country in other languages and cultures, just like the names of the Greeks. The civilization and its associated territory and people, which is referred to in English as "Greece", have never referred to themselves in that term. They have rather called themselves 'Hellenes', adopting the traditional appellation of the Hellas region.

== Background ==
=== Historical ===
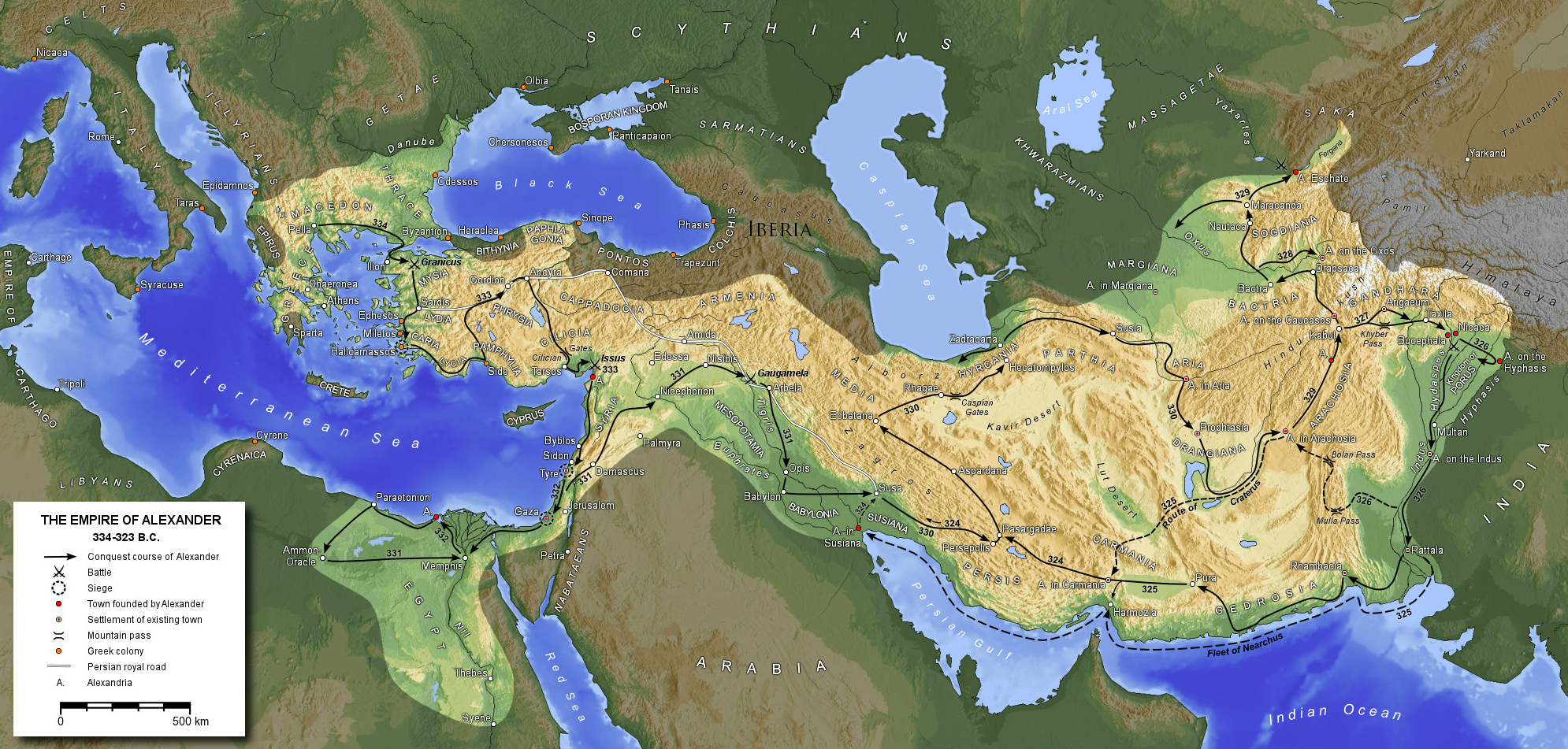
Map of the Macedonian Empire, established by the military conquests of Alexander the Great in 334–323 BC.

By the 4th century BC, the process of Hellenization had started in southwestern Anatolia's Lycia, Caria and Pisidia regions. (1st century fortifications at Pelum in Galatia, on Baş Dağ in Lycaonia and at Isaura are the only known Hellenistic-style structures in central and eastern Anatolia).

When it was advantageous to do so, places like Side and Aspendos invented Greek-themed origin myths; an inscription published in SEG shows that in the 4th century BC Aspendos claimed ties to Argos, similar to Nikokreon of Cyprus who also claimed Argive lineage. (Argos was home to the Kings of Macedon.) Like the Argeads, the Antigonids claimed descent from Heracles, the Seleucids from Apollo, and the Ptolemies from Dionysus.

The Seuthopolis inscription was very influential in the modern study of Thrace. The inscription mentions Dionysus, Apollo and some Samothracian gods. Scholars have interpreted the inscription as evidence of Hellenization in inland Thrace during the early Hellenistic period, but this has been challenged by recent scholarship.

However, Hellenization had its limitations. For example, areas of southern Syria that were affected by Greek culture mostly entailed Seleucid urban centres, where Greek was commonly spoken. The countryside, on the other hand, was largely unaffected, with most of its inhabitants speaking Syriac, continuing their native traditions.

By itself, archaeological evidence only gives researchers an incomplete picture of Hellenization; it is often not possible to state with certainty whether particular archaeological findings belonged to Greeks, Hellenized indigenous peoples, indigenous people who simply owned Greek-style objects or some combination of these groups. Thus, literary sources are also used to help researchers interpret archaeological findings.

== Regions ==
=== Anatolia ===
Greek cultural influence spread into Anatolia in a slow rate from the 6th to 4th century BCE. The Lydians had been particularly receptive to Greek culture, as were the 4th century dynasties of Caria and Lycia as well as the inhabitants of the Cilician plain and of the regions of Paphlagonia. The local population found their desires for advancement a stimulus to learn Greek. The indigenous urban settlements and villages in Anatolia coalesced, on their own initiative, to form cities in the Greek manner. The local kings of Asia Minor adopted Greek as their official language and sought to imitate other Greek cultural forms.

The first properly Greek settlements in Anatolia originated shortly after the end of the Bronze age, around the 11th century BCE. Mycenaean settlements at Halicarnassus, Miletus, and Colophon existed before this, but Mycenaean colonization in the region was sporadic at best and not on the same scale as the later Greek colonization of Anatolia. These initial posts in the 2nd millennium BCE, however, were less colonies in the traditional sense and more akin to the factories of the Age of Discovery; that is, that they were trading posts initially established to conduct trade with Anatolian locals. By the beginning of the Archaic period, settlement of Anatolia had begun to grow at a quick rate, and proper colonies in the traditional sense were established in the form of predominantly Greek city-states (πόλεις, póleis). Extensive trade between mainland Greece and the Hellenistic portions of Anatolia was underway by the 8th to 7th centuries BCE, with fish, grain, timber, metal, and often slaves being exported from the land. It is believed that this kind of contact with the spread of Hellenistic culture, religion, and ideas in Anatolia was a peaceful process.

Worship of the Greek pantheon of gods was practiced in Lydia. Lydian king Croesus often invited the wisest Greek philosophers, orators and statesmen to attend his court. Croesus himself often consulted the famous oracle at Delphi, bestowing many gifts and offerings to this and other religious sites. He provided patronage for the reconstruction of the Temple of Artemis, to which he offered a large number of marble columns as dedication to the goddess.

It was in the towns that Hellenization made its greatest progress, with the process often being synonymous with urbanization. Hellenization reached Pisidia and Lycia sometime in the 4th century BC, but the interior remained largely unaffected for several more centuries until it came under Roman rule in the 1st century BC. Ionian, Aeolian and Doric settlers along Anatolia's Western coast seemed to have remained culturally Greek and some of their city-states date back to the Archaic Period. On the other hand, Greeks who settled in the southwestern region of Pisidia and Pamphylia seem to have been assimilated by the local culture.

==== Pisidia and Pamphylia ====
Pamphylia is a plain located between the highlands of Lycia and Cilicia. The exact date of Greek settlement in the region is not known; one possible theory is that settlers arrived in the region as part of Bronze Age maritime trade between the Aegean, Levant and Cyprus, while another attributes it to population movements during the instability of the Bronze Age Collapse. The Greek dialect established in Pamphylia by the Classical period was related to Arcado-Cypriot.

Mopsus is a legendary founder of several coastal cities in southwestern Anatolia, including Aspendos, Phaselis, Perge and Sillyon. A bilingual Phoenician and neo-Hittite Luwian inscription found at Karatepe, dated to 800 BC, says that the ruling dynasty there traced their origins to Mopsus. Mopsus, whose name is also attested to in Hittite documents, may originally have been an Anatolian figure that became part of the cultural traditions of Pamphylia's early Greek settlers. Attested to in Linear B texts, he is given a Greek genealogy as a descendant of Manto and Apollo.

For centuries the indigenous population exerted considerable influence on Greek settlers, but after the 4th century BC this population quickly started to become Hellenized. Little is known about Pisidia prior to the 3rd century BC, but there is quite a bit of archeological evidence that dates to the Hellenistic period. Literary evidence, however, including inscriptions and coins are limited. During the 3rd and 2nd centuries BC, native regional tongues were abandoned in favour of koine Greek and settlements began to take on characteristics of Greek polis.

The Iron Age Panemoteichos I may be an early precursor to later regional Hellenistic settlements including Selge, Termessos and Sagalassos (believed to be the three most prominent cities of Hellenistic Pisidia). The site is evidence of "urban organisation" that predates the Greek polis by 500 years. Based on Panemoteichos I and other Iron Age sites, including the Phrygian Midas şehri and the Cappadocian fortification of Kerkenes, experts believe that "behind the Greek influence that shaped the Hellenistic Pisidian communities there lay a tangible and important Anatolian tradition."

According to the writings of Arrian the population of Side, who traced their origins to Aeolian Cyme, had forgotten the Greek language by the time Alexander arrived at the city in 334 BC. There are coins and stone inscriptions that attest to a unique script from the region but the language has only been partially deciphered.

==== Phrygia ====
The latest dateable coins found at the Phrygian capital of Gordion are from the 2nd century BC. Finds from the abandoned Hellenistic era settlement include imported and locally produced imitation Greek-style terracotta figurines and ceramics. Inscriptions show that some of the inhabitants had Greek names, while others had Anatolian or possibly Celtic names. Many Phrygian cult objects were Hellenized during the Hellenistic period, but worship of traditional deities like the Phrygian mother goddess persisted. Greek cults attested to include Hermes, Kybele, the Muses and Tyche.

=== Crimea ===
Panticapaeum (modern day Kerch) was one of the early Greek colonies in Crimea. It was founded by Miletus around 600 BC on a site with good terrain for a defensive acropolis. By the time the Cimmerian colonies had organized into the Bosporan Kingdom much of the local native population had been Hellenized. Most scholars date the establishment of the kingdom to 480 BC, when the Archaeanactid dynasty assumed control of Panticapaeum, but classical archaeologist Gocha R. Tsetskhladze has dated the kingdom's founding to 436 BC, when the Spartocid dynasty replaced the ruling Archaeanactids.

=== Judea ===
The Hellenistic Seleucid and Ptolemaic kingdoms that formed after Alexander's death were particularly relevant to the history of Judaism. Located between the two kingdoms, Judea experienced long periods of warfare and instability. Judea fell under Seleucid control in 198 BC. By the time Antiochus IV Epiphanes came to rule Judea in 175 BC, Jerusalem was already somewhat Hellenized. In 170 BC, both claimants to the High Priesthood, Jason and Menelaus, bore Greek names. Jason had established institutions of Greek education and in later years Jewish culture started to be suppressed including forbidding circumcision and observance of the Sabbath.

The Tomb of Benei Hezir in Jerusalem, a Hasmonean-era rock-cut tomb of a Jewish priestly family (2nd-1st century BCE) with Doric columns

Hellenization of members of the Jewish elite included names and clothes, but other customs were adapted by the rabbis, and elements that violated the halakha and midrash were prohibited. One example is the elimination of some aspects of Hellenistic banquets, such as the practice of offering libations to the gods, while incorporating certain elements that gave the meals a more Jewish character. Discussion of Scripture, the singing of sacred songs and attendance of students of the Torah were encouraged. One detailed account of Jewish-style Hellenistic banquets comes from Ben Sira. There is literary evidence from Philo about the extravagance of Alexandrian Jewish banquets, and The Letter of Aristeas discusses Jews dining with non-Jews as an opportunity to share Jewish wisdom.

=== Syria ===
Greek art and culture reached Phoenicia by way of commerce before any Greek cities were founded in Syria, but the Hellenization of Syrians was not widespread until it became a Roman province. Under Roman rule in the 1st century BC, there is evidence of Hellenistic style funerary architecture, decorative elements, mythological references, and inscriptions. However, there is a lack of evidence from Hellenistic Syria; concerning this, most scholars view it as the case that the "absence of evidence is not evidence of absence".

=== Bactria and India ===
The Bactrians, an Iranian ethnic group who lived in Bactria (northern Afghanistan), were Hellenized during the reign of the Greco-Bactrian Kingdom and soon after various tribes in northwestern regions of the Indian subcontinent underwent Hellenization during the reign of the Indo-Greek Kingdom.

=== Parthia ===
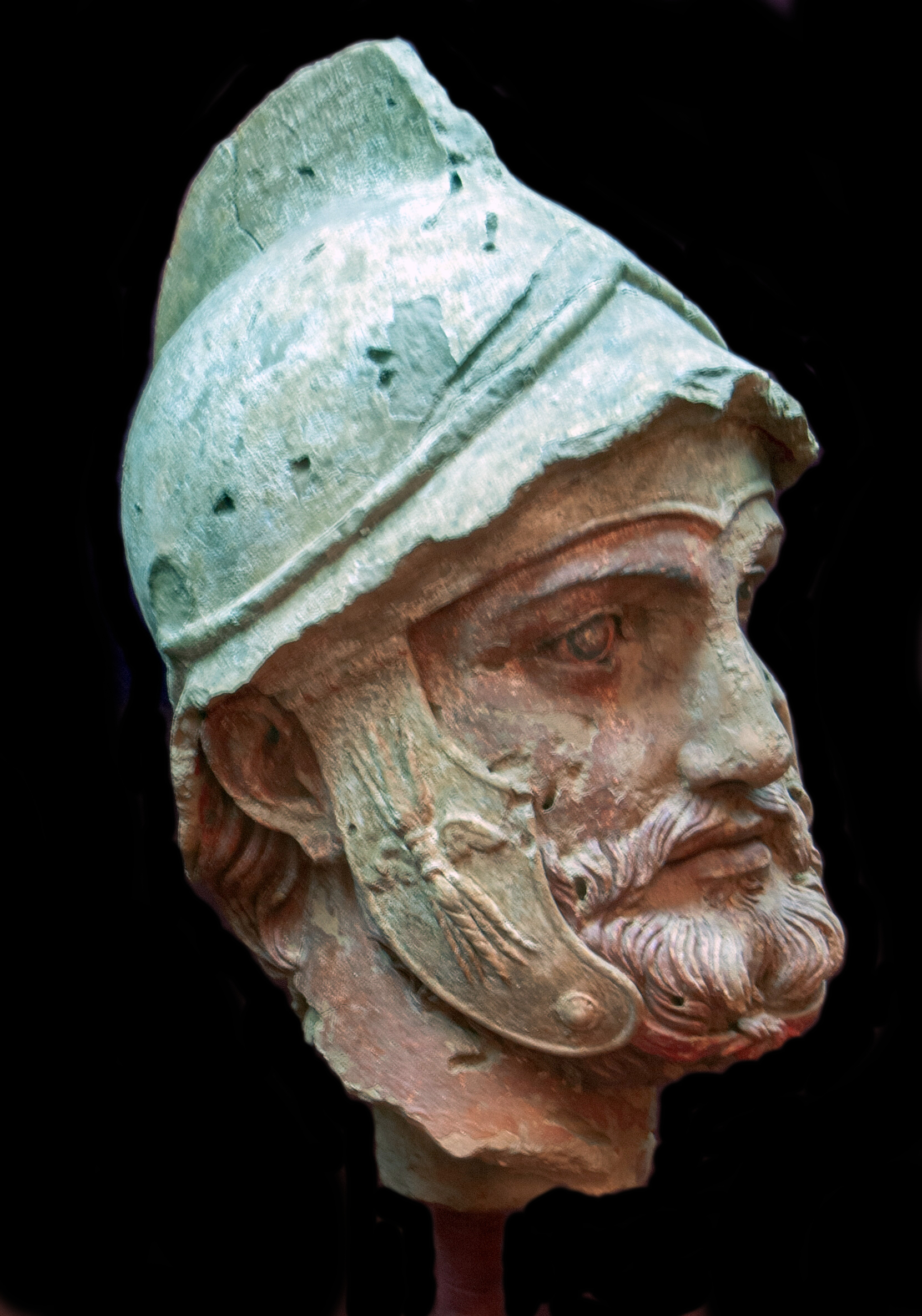
The Nisa helmeted warrior, a Hellenistic figure or deity, from the Parthian royal residence and necropolis of Nisa, Turkmenistan, 2nd century BC

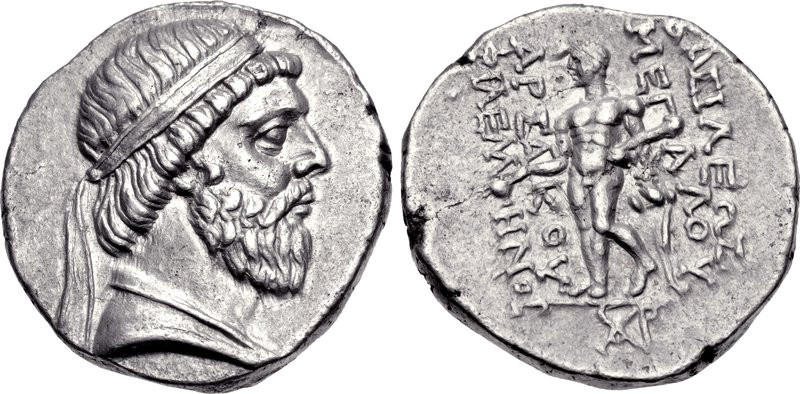
Drachma of Mithridates I, showing him wearing a beard and a royal diadem on his head. Reverse side: Heracles/Verethragna, holding a club in his left hand and a cup in his right hand; Greek inscription reading ΒΑΣΙΛΕΩΣ ΜΕΓΑΛΟΥ ΑΡΣΑΚΟΥ ΦΙΛΕΛΛΗΝΟΣ "of the Great King Arsaces the Philhellene"

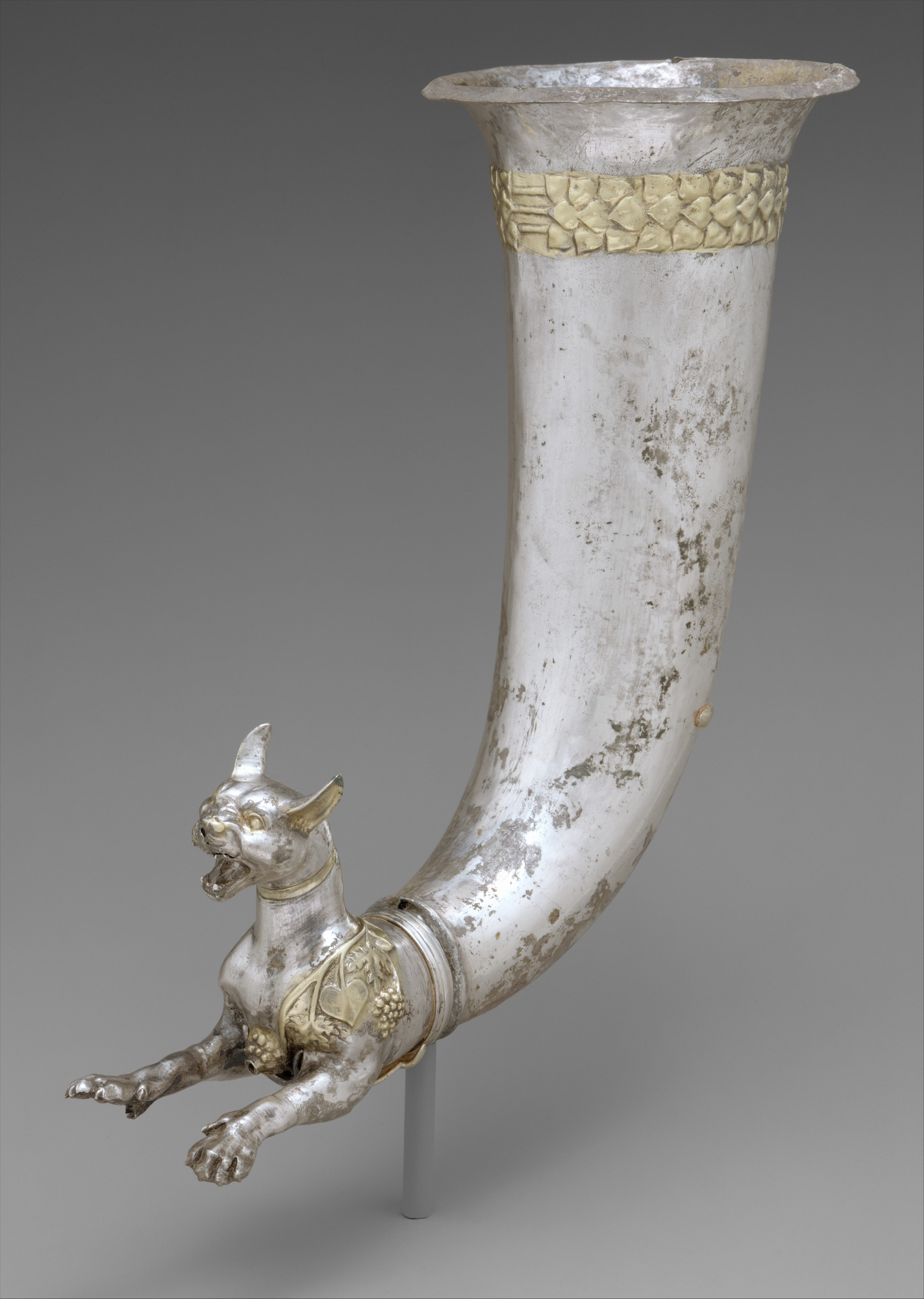
Rhyton terminating in the forepart of a wild cat showing Hellenistic influences

=== Arabia ===
Parts of pre-Islamic Arabia were partially influenced by Greeks. Hellenization first reaches the peninsula in the 3rd century BC, in Eastern Arabia, shown by the amphorae in that region that came from Rhodes and Chios. In South Arabia, Hellenization begins in the 2nd or 1st centuries BCE, around the time of the last of the kings of Qataban. In the resurgent period of the South Arabian Kingdom of Awsan, during the 2nd or 1st centuries BCE, an evolution of the iconography of the kings is seen: they are transformed from wearing traditional South Arabian clothing to being shown dressed as a Roman citizen would, with curly hair and wearing a toga. At the Kingdom of Saba, the traditional Near Eastern norms of iconographic depictions of the gods give way to Roman and Hellenistic anthropomorphic styles around the turn of the Christian era. Recently, Latin inscriptions have revealed a Roman military presence as far south as the Farasan Islands, in southwestern Saudi Arabia.

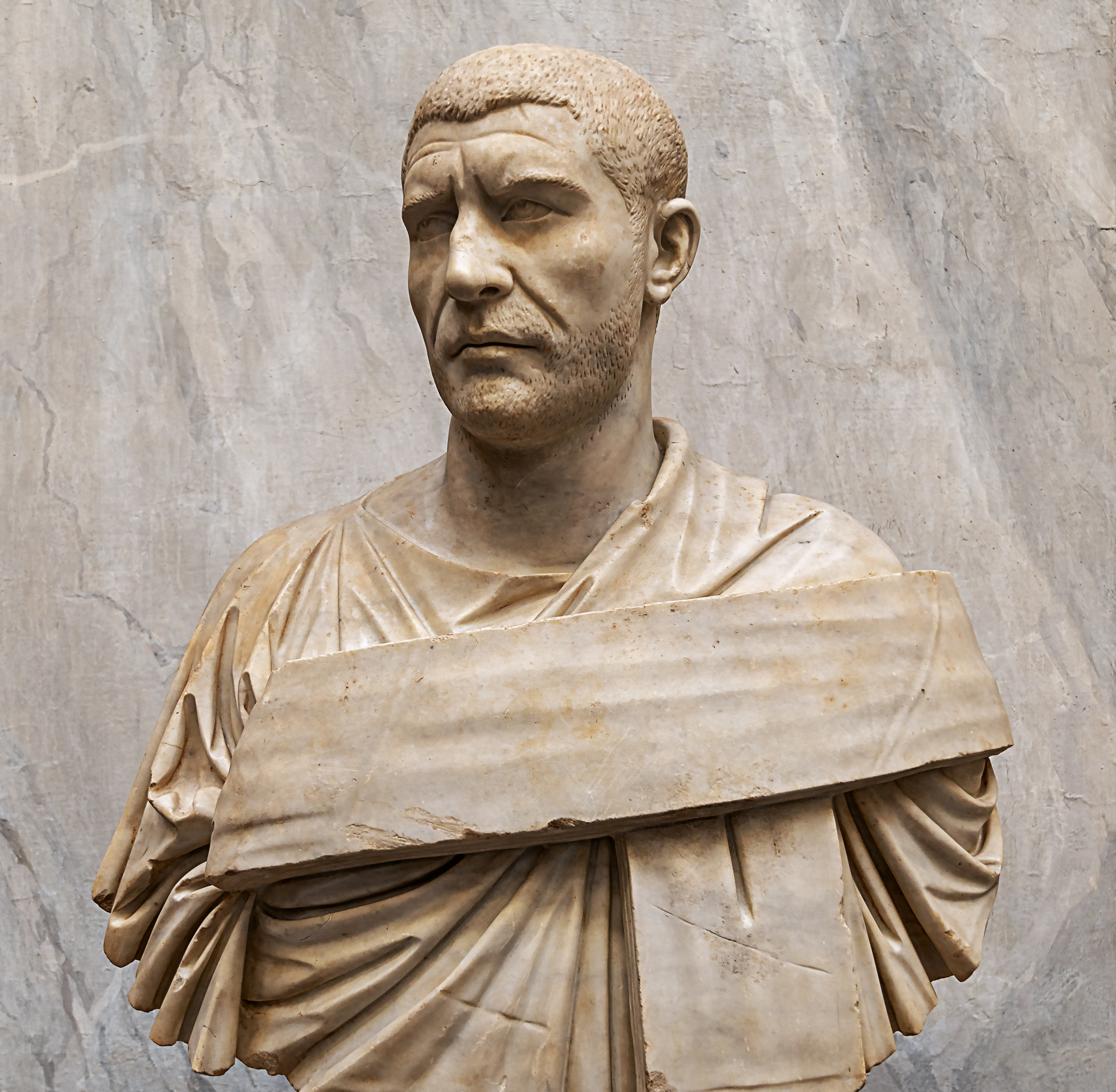
Bust of the Roman emperor Philip the Arab

In 106 CE, the Roman Empire conquered the northwest Arabian Nabataean Kingdom and they set up a province called Arabia Petraea (Roman Arabia). By this time, Roman rule had already long been imposed on Arabic-speaking populations in Syria, the Transjordan, and Palestine. The new conquests had extended this rule to northwest Arabia, including the northern parts of the Hejaz. Archaeological finds of Roman military encampments have been made at Hegra (Mada'in Salih), located today in the Medina Province of Saudi Arabia, and at Ruwafa, as shown by the second-century Greek-Arabic bilingual Ruwafa inscriptions. The Letter of the Archimandrites dating to 569/570, composed in Greek but preserved in Syriac, demonstrating the presence and distribution of episcopal sees from its 137 Archimandrite signatories from the province of Roman Arabia. Safaitic inscriptions mention the Roman emperor. Arabic-speaking tribes were gradually converting to Christianity or becoming foederati of the emperor, resulting in increasing integration into the Roman world over time. In the mid-sixth century, for example, Justinian I was closely allied with the Ghassanids, a Hellenized Christian Arab kingdom.

In Central Arabia, statues of Greek deities like Artemis, Heracles, and Harpocrates have been discovered have been found at Qaryat al-Faw, the former capital of the Kingdom of Kinda.

== Early Christianity ==
The periodization of the Hellenistic Age, between the conquests of Alexander the Great up to Octavian's victory at the Battle of Actium, has been attributed to the 19th-century historian J. G. Droysen. According to this model the spread of Greek culture during this period made the rise of Christianity possible. Later, in the 20th century, scholars questioned this 19th-century paradigm for failing to account for the contributions of Semitic-speaking and other Near Eastern cultures.

The twentieth century witnessed a lively debate over the extent of Hellenization in the Levant, particularly among the ancient Jews, which has continued until today. Interpretations on the rise of Early Christianity, which was applied most famously by Rudolf Bultmann, used to see Judaism as largely unaffected by Hellenism, and the Judaism of the diaspora was thought to have succumbed thoroughly to its influences. Bultmann thus argued that Christianity arose almost completely within those Hellenistic confines and should be read against that background, as opposed to a more traditional Jewish background. With the publication of Martin Hengel's two-volume study Hellenism and Judaism (1974, German original 1972) and subsequent studies Jews, Greeks and Barbarians: Aspects of the Hellenisation of Judaism in the pre-Christian Period (1980, German original 1976) and The 'Hellenisation' of Judaea in the First Century after Christ (1989, German original 1989), the tide began to turn decisively. Hengel argued that virtually all of Judaism was highly Hellenized well before the beginning of the Christian era, and even the Greek language was well known throughout the cities and even the smaller towns of Jewish Palestine. Scholars have continued to nuance Hengel's views, but almost all believe that strong Hellenistic influences were throughout the Levant, even among the conservative Jewish communities, which were the most nationalistic.

In his introduction to the 1964 book Meditations, Anglican priest Maxwell Staniforth discussed the profound influence of Stoic philosophy on Christianity:

Again in the doctrine of the Trinity, the ecclesiastical conception of Father, Word, and Spirit finds its germ in the different Stoic names of the Divine Unity. Thus Seneca, writing of the supreme Power which shapes the universe, states, 'This Power we sometimes call the All-ruling God, sometimes the incorporeal Wisdom, sometimes the holy Spirit, sometimes Destiny.' The Church had only to reject the last of these terms to arrive at its own acceptable definition of the Divine Nature; while the further assertion 'these three are One', which the modern mind finds paradoxical, was no more than commonplace to those familiar with Stoic notions.

== Eastern Roman Empire ==
The Greek East was one of the two main cultural areas of the Roman Empire and began to be ruled by an autonomous imperial court in AD 286 under Diocletian. However, Rome remained the nominal capital of both parts of the empire, and Latin was the state language. When the Western Empire fell and the Roman Senate sent the regalia of the Western Emperor to the Eastern Emperor Zeno in AD 476, Constantinople (Byzantium in Ancient Greek) was recognized as the seat of the sole Emperor. A process of political Hellenization began and led, among other reforms, to the declaration of Greek as the official language.

== Modern times ==
In 1909, a commission appointed by the Greek government reported that a third of the villages of Greece should have their names changed, often because of their non-Greek origin. In other instances, names were changed from a contemporary name of Greek origin to the ancient Greek name. Some village names were formed from a Greek root word with a foreign suffix or vice versa. Most of the name changes took place in areas populated by ethnic Greeks in which a stratum of foreign or divergent toponyms had accumulated over the centuries. However, in some parts of northern Greece, the population was not Greek-speaking, and many of the former toponyms had reflected the diverse ethnic and linguistic origins of their inhabitants.

The process of the change of toponyms in modern Greece has been described as a process of Hellenization. A modern use is in connection with policies pursuing "cultural harmonization and education of the linguistic minorities resident within the modern Greek state" - the Hellenization of minority groups in modern Greece. The term Hellenisation (or Hellenization) is also used in the context of Greek opposition to the use of the Slavic dialects of Greece. Mostly Bulgarians were target of Hellenisation.

In 1870, the Greek government abolished all Italian schools in the Ionian islands, which had been annexed to Greece six years earlier. That led to the diminution of the community of Corfiot Italians, which had lived in Corfu since the Middle Ages; by the 1940s, there were only 400 Corfiot Italians left.

=== Arvanites ===
Arvanites are descendants of Albanian settlers who came to the present southern Greece in the late 13th and early 14th century. With participation in the Greek War of Independence and the Greek Civil War, this has led to increasing assimilation amongst the Arvanites. The common Orthodox Christian faith they shared with the rest of the local population was one of the main reasons that led to their assimilation. Other reasons for assimilation are large-scale internal migration to the cities and subsequent intermingling of the population. Although sociological studies of Arvanite communities still used to note an identifiable sense of a special "ethnic" identity among Arvanites, the authors did not identify or never identified a sense of 'belonging to Albania or to the Albanian nation'. Many Arvanites find the designation "Albanians" offensive as they identify nationally and ethnically as Greeks and not Albanians. Because of this, relations between Arvanites and other Albanian-speaking populations have diverged over time. During the onset of the Greek war of Independence, Arvanites fought alongside Greek revolutionaries against Muslim Albanians. For example, Arvanites participated in the 1821 Tripolitsa Massacre of Muslim Albanians, while some Muslim Albanian speakers in the region of Bardounia remained after the war, converting to Orthodoxy. In recent times, Arvanites have expressed mixed opinions towards recent Albanian settlers within Greece. Other Arvanites during the late 1980s and early 1990s expressed solidarity with Albanian immigrants, due to linguistic similarities and being politically leftist. Relations too between Arvanites and other Orthodox Albanian-speaking communities such as those of Greek Epirus are mixed, as they are distrusted regarding religious matters due to a past Albanian Muslim population living amongst them.

There are no monolingual Arvanitika-speakers, as all are today bilingual in Greek. However, while Arvanites are bilingual in Greek and Arvanitika, Arvanitika is considered an endangered language as it is in a state of attrition due to the large-scale language shift towards Greek among the descendants of Arvanitika-speakers in recent decades, becoming monolingual Greek speakers in the end, and since Arvanitika is almost exclusively a spoken language, Arvanites also no longer have practical affiliation with the Standard Albanian language used in Albania, as they do not use this form in writing or in media.

== See also ==
- Aromanians
- Byzantine Greeks
- Byzantine Empire
- Culture of Greece
- Dehellenization of Christianity
- Greek nationalism
- Greek Orthodox Church
- Hellenistic philosophy
- Hellenistic philosophy and Christianity
- Hellenization in the Byzantine Empire
- Hellenocentrism
- History of Greece
- Koine Greek, the language of the New Testament
- Mixobarbaroi
- Philhellenism, particularly from the mid-19th century
