= Kusztyk =

Glass goblet without a base

A kusztyk (alternative spellings: kuszyk or kulawka) is a glass goblet without a base. Its design is such that it cannot be placed upright, thereby requiring its contents to be entirely drunk before the vessel can safely be set down again. This vessel type reached a height in popularity in seventeenth- and eighteenth-century Poland. Though the origin of its unusual shape remains unclear, it is supposed that the kusztyk would have contained alcohol (likely champagne, or a sparkling wine) or water that was chilled in ice buckets prior to serving. The kusztyk remains a facet of Polish banqueting custom today as a vessel raised during toasts.

It has been acknowledged that the kusztyk shares a visual similarity with the ancient Greek rhyton, however, it is unlikely that these vessels were employed during equivalent ritualistic occasions. It is more certain that the kusztyk has a shared history with the so-called, Hodgett’s decanter, which was popular in eighteenth-century England.

== See also ==
- Rhyton
