= Lion head horn =

- Material: Silver & gold
- Size: H. to rim (as it stands) 23.5 cm. (true, extended) l. 33 cm., rim diam. 10.9-11.2 cm, rim th. 2mm, lion head dimensions 5 x 3.7 x 4.4 cm, diam. at the junction of horn and head 3.6 cm, wt. 604.76 g.
- Discovered: Unknown
- Present location: Private collection of Vassil Bojkov, Sofia, Bulgaria

The lion head horn is one of several kinds of drinking horns that have been used throughout Eurasia since prehistoric times. Horns with animal heads have been found among artifacts from the Near East and the Middle East, dating perhaps to classical antiquity or the time of Archaic Greece. The lion head horn, while not very common, does seem to have recurred across a span of several centuries.

== Description ==
The lion head horn is an undecorated silver horn that has a flaring rim and tapers down to the tip. It curves at an obtuse angle, and its lower extremity is inserted into the back of the gold lion head, and fixed with four gold rivets. The vase is not properly a rhyton, since no secondary orifice is present. A hole on the upper left canine of the lion is very small for effective pouring: it seems accidental. The ferocious animal is shown with an open mouth, prominent canines, and a protruding tongue, in a grimace shared by animals and monsters of the Archaic Greek art. The wrinkled skin on both sides of the muzzle with its triangular nostrils is rendered as continuous lines and dots. Similar dots run along the upper half of the mouth contour, while the lower half shows a chased pattern of minuscule ovals. Punched circles and hatching appear in the mouth's interior. The eyes are almond-shaped, and two low, circular protuberances on the forehead are covered with hatching. The semicircular ears have three radial lines in their interior. The mane is rendered as a plastic collar of a triangular section. Its front and back sides are covered with finely chiseled, stylized hairlocks.

== Origin ==
Among the various types of rhyta and horns, the one with an animal head termination on a longhorn seems the least popular in the Near and Middle Eastern cultural domains. The horns are usually provided with an animal forepart, while the simple heads of rather large dimensions are typically combined with a straight or flaring calyx-like neck. Manassero, who collected the evidence in all materials and reviewed the earlier literature, counts four metal exemplars of the Archaic period, of which only two are made of silver, or silver and gold, both with a lion head finial. The type enjoyed a revival in Scythia during the Classical period, often with animal heads of precious metal mounted on real horns; it continued in a pipe-like version well into the Hellenistic times.

The bronze lion heads are large, strongly stylized, with an almost flat muzzle; they have little in common with the VBC gold head. They presumably originate in Luristan and are undeniably much earlier than our exemplar. Several silver exemplars entered the art market, and later some of them even museum collections, (Louvre, Metropolitan Museum, Miho Museum) without any documentation, since they were from illicit digging, reportedly "from a cave cache", which became known as the "Western Cave", in Kal-e Makarekh (or Kalmakarra), western Iran. The silver rhyta have their lion head finials made of gold and soldered onto the silver horn. All horns are undecorated with very slight tapering towards the finial. All lion heads are quite large (up to three times as big as the VBC exemplar), and show the same stylistic features, chiseled details, and rings on the point of their junction with the horn. None of them is a rhyton stricto sensu, since they are not supplied with a secondary orifice. Consequently, they are supposed to have been made in the same pre-Achaemenid western Iranian workshop, possibly in the second half of the 7th century BC.
