= Achaemenid Persian Lion Rhyton =

Ancient Achaemenian gold cup

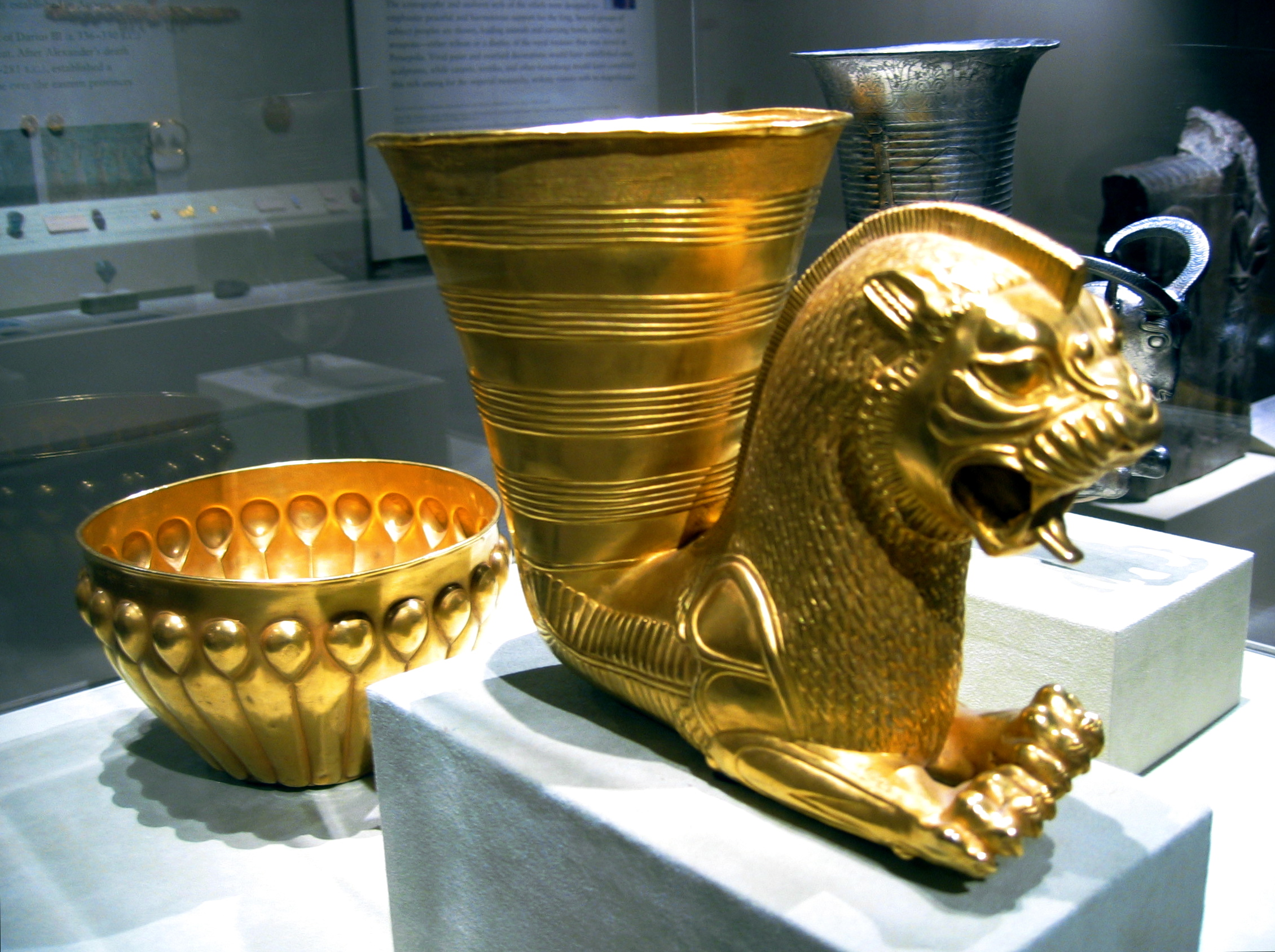
Persia - Achaemenian Vessels

The Achaemenid Persian Lion Rhyton (Persian: تکوک شیر غران) is a gold rhyton from the Achaemenid Empire, dated to about 500 BC. It is 6.7 inches high (about 17 cm.) and is made in solid gold, with the different parts joined together by soldering, done so skilfully as to leave no obvious marks.

It was excavated in diggings sponsored by the Fletcher Fund in 1954 in southwest Persia and is now in the Metropolitan Museum of Art in New York City, United States.

A rhyton is a kind of cup or drinking vessel which normally terminates in the shape of an animal's head or horns, common in the Near East and ancient Greece.

Early Iranians used rhyta with an animal head at the end of the vessel; later in the Achaemenid period the animal part of the rhyton was usually located in front of it and at a 90-degree angle to the vessel.
