= Rhyton =

Ancient drinking horn or cup from Eurasia

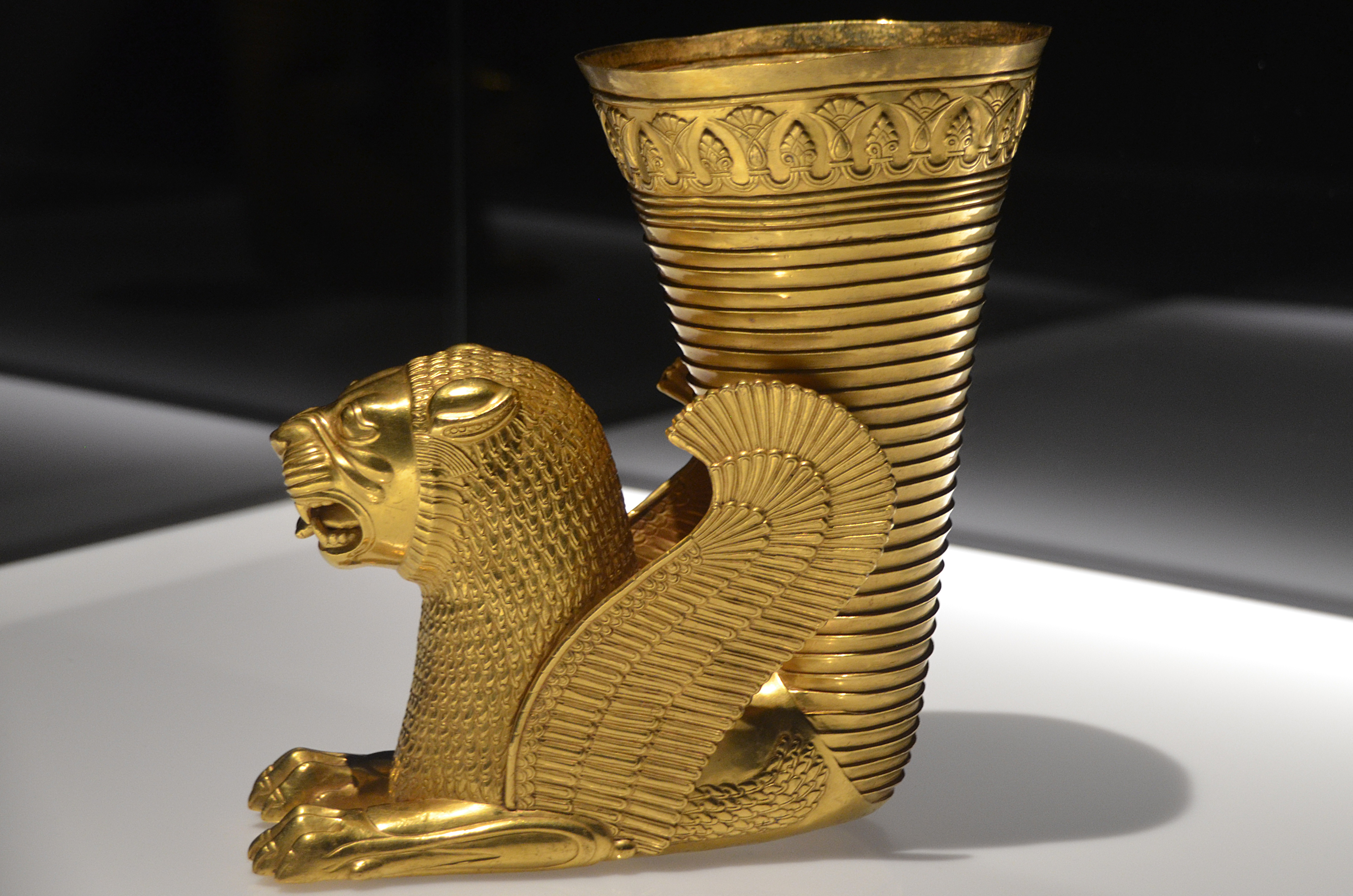
- Golden rhyton from Iran's Achaemenid Empire (550–330 BC), excavated at Ecbatana, kept at the National Museum of Iran.
- Material: Ceramic, metal, horn, stone
- Size: Cup-size for practical use, larger for ceremonial use, typically in a roughly conical shape caused by a spout or a pseudo-spout at the bottom.
- Writing: May be inscribed and otherwise decorated
- Created: Prehistoric times through the present

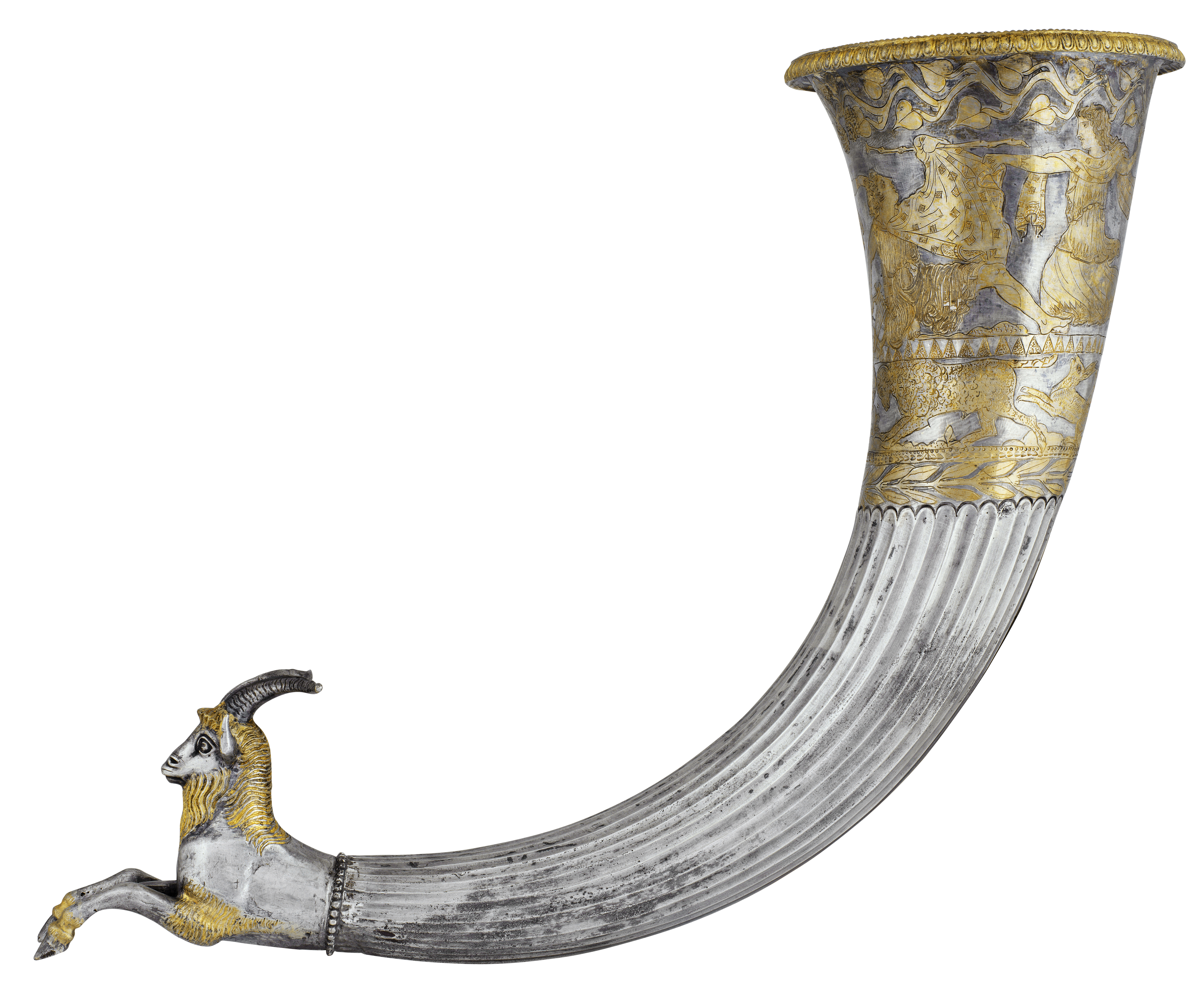
Silver rhyton with goat protome and death of Orpheus, c. 420–410 BC, housed in the Vassil Bojkov Collection, Sofia, Bulgaria. The horn in a continuous and graceful curve makes a right-angled bend. Its lower two thirds are covered by flutes with arc-shaped upper tips. A figural scene below the flaring rim represents the murder of Orpheus. The musician is the central figure, fallen to his right knee, flanked by three attacking Thracian women. He holds a six-string lyre on his right hand and with his left one, wrapped in his mantle, a knobbed wooden stick, with which he tries vainly to protect himself.

A rhyton /ˈraɪˌtɒn, ˈraɪtən/ (pl.: rhyta or rhytons) (Ancient Greek: ῥυτόν rhŭtón) is a roughly conical container from which fluids were intended to be drunk or to be poured in some ceremony such as libation, or merely at table; in other words, a cup. A rhyton is typically formed in the shape of either an animal's head or an animal horn; in the latter case it often terminates in the shape of an animal's body. Rhyta were produced over large areas of ancient Eurasia during the Bronze and Iron Ages, especially from Persia to the Balkans.

Many have an opening at the bottom through which the liquid fell; this could be either for pouring libations, or as a way of drinking. Others did not, and were merely used as drinking cups, with the characteristic, shared by many early cup forms, that they were "unstable" and could not usually be set down on a surface without spilling their contents.

The conical rhyton form has been known in the Aegean region since the Bronze Age, or the 2nd millennium BC. However, it was by no means confined to that region. Similar in form to, and perhaps originating from, the drinking horn, it has been widespread over Eurasia since prehistoric times.

== Name and function ==
Liddell and Scott give a standard derivation from Greek rhein, "to flow", which, according to Julius Pokorny, is from Indo-European *sreu-, "flow". As rhutos is "stream", the neuter, rhuton, would be some sort of object associated with pouring, which is equivalent to English pourer. Many rhyta featured a wide mouth at the top and a hole through a conical constriction at the bottom from which the fluid ran. The idea is that one scooped wine or water from a storage vessel or similar source, held it up, unstoppered the hole with one's thumb, and let the fluid run into the mouth (or onto the ground in libation) in the same way that wine is drunk from a wineskin today.

Smith points out that this use is testified in classical paintings and accepts Athenaeus's etymology that it was named ἀπὸ τῆς ῥύσεως, "from the flowing". Smith also categorized the name as having been a recent form (in classical times) of a vessel formerly called the keras, "horn", in the sense of a drinking horn. The word rhyton is not present in what is known about Mycenaean Greek, the oldest form of Greek written in Linear B. However, the bull's head rhyton, of which many examples survive, is mentioned as ke-ra-a on tablet KN K 872, an inventory of vessels at Knossos; it is shown with the bull ideogram (*227^{VAS}; also known as rhyton). Ventris and Chadwick restored the word as the adjective *kera(h)a, with a Mycenaean intervocalic h.

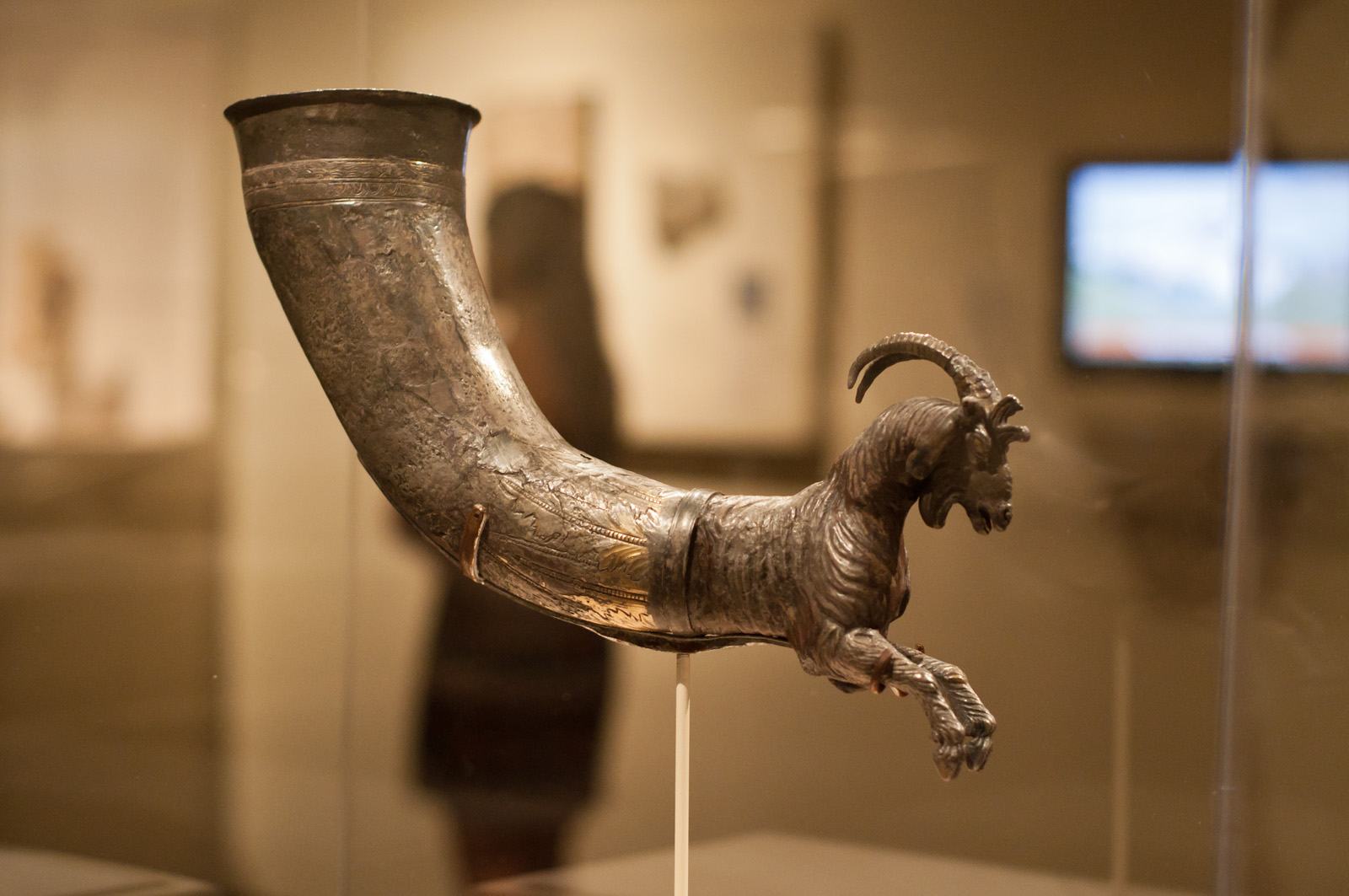
A rhyton drinking vessel with animal details; such vessels were widely produced in Persia during the Achaemenid Empire (550–330 BC), though the lifelike animal details as seen in this one date from the later Parthian Empire (247 BC – AD 224).

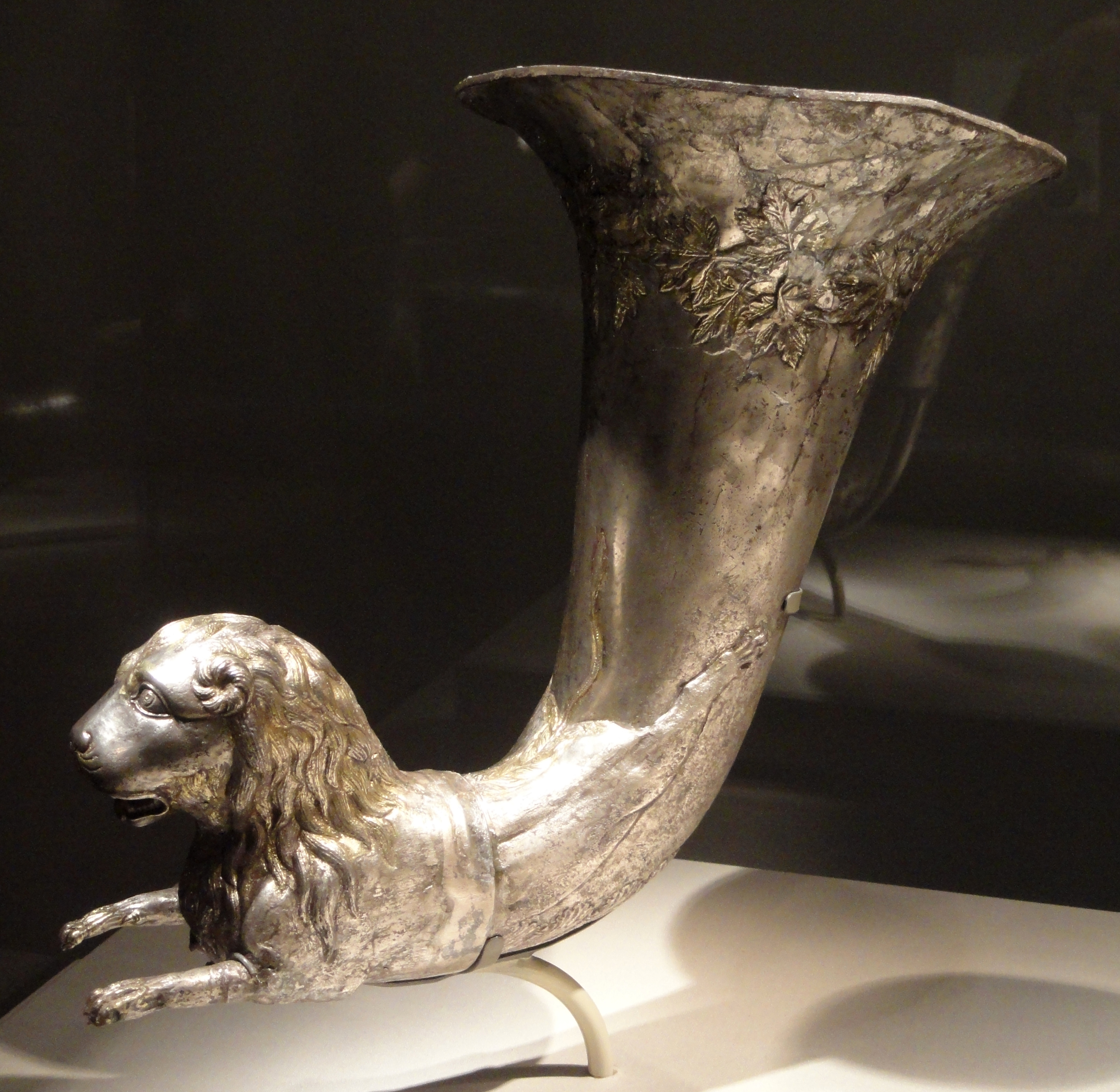
A rhyton wine horn with lion protome, Iran, Parthian period, 1st century BC – 1st century AD, silver and gilt, housed in the Arthur M. Sackler Gallery

Rhyta shaped after bulls are filled through the large opening and emptied through the secondary, smaller one. This means that two hands are required: one to close the secondary opening and one to fill the rhyton. This has led some scholars to believe that rhyta were typically filled with the help of two people or with the help of a chain or a rope that would be passed through a handle. A bull rhyton weighed about three kilograms when empty and up to six kilograms when full.

Other rhyta with animal themes were modeled after boars, lions, and lionesses (such as Lion head horn). Some shapes, such as lioness rhyta, could be filled through simple submersion, thanks to the vessel's shape and buoyancy. Horizontally designed rhyta, like those modeled after lionesses, could be filled by being lowered into a fluid and supported. Vertically designed rhyta, like those modeled after boars, required another hand to cover the primary opening and prevent the liquid from spilling as the vessel was filled.

Rhyta were often used to strain liquids such as wine, beer, and oil. Some rhyta were used in blood rituals and animal sacrifice. In these cases, the blood may have been thinned with wine. Some vessels were modeled after the animal with which they were intended to be used during ritual, but this was not always the case.

== Geography ==
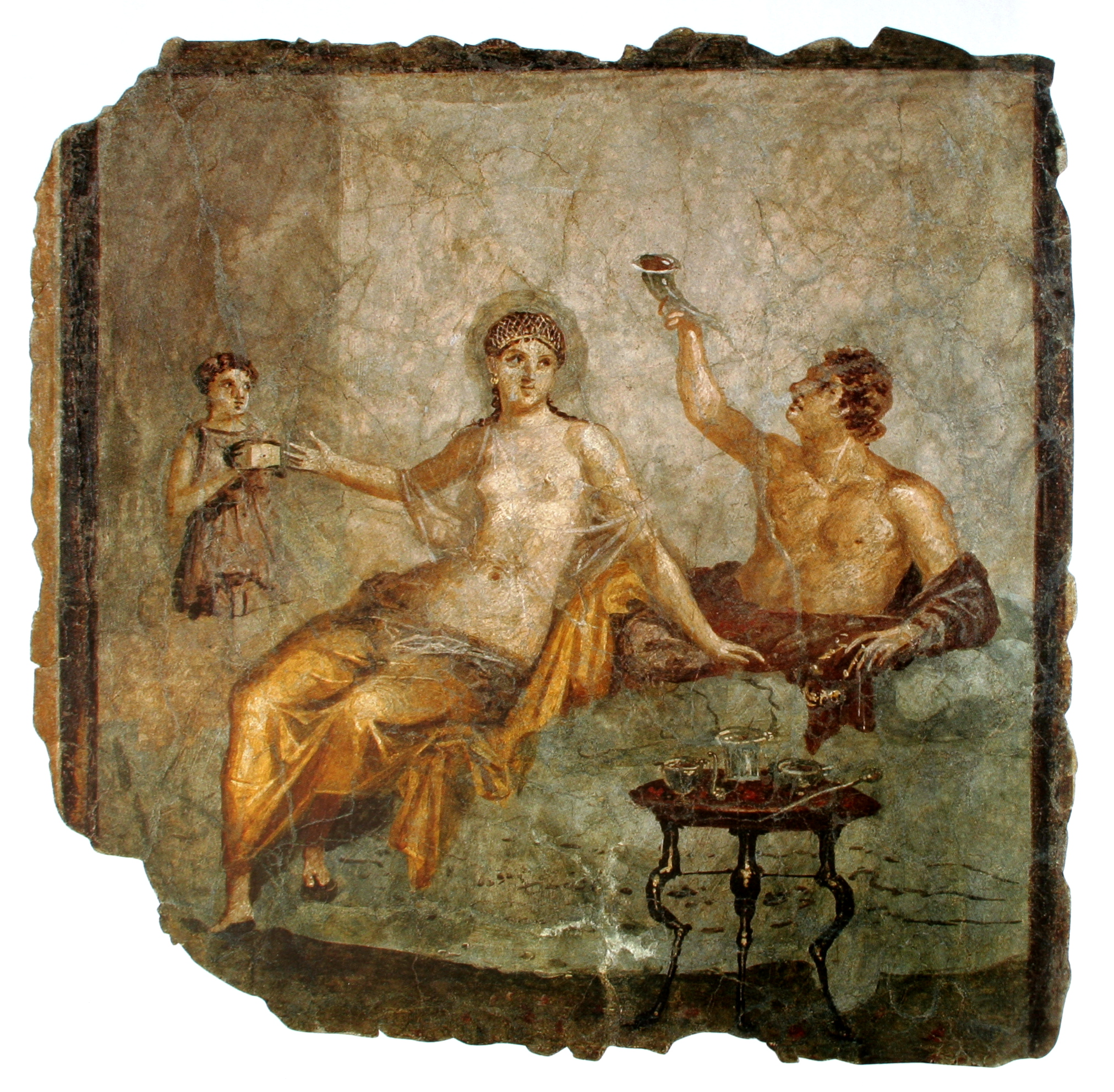
Roman fresco from Herculaneum demonstrating the use of a rhyton, c. 50 BC

Not every drinking horn or libation vessel was pierced at the bottom. An aperture invites zoomorphic interpretation and plastic decoration in the forms of animal heads—bovids, equines, cervids, and even canines—with the fluid pouring from the animals' mouths.

Rhyta occur among the remains of civilizations speaking different languages and language groups in and around the Near and Middle East, such as Persia, from the second millennium BC. They are often shaped like animals' heads or horns and can be very ornate and compounded with precious metals and stones. In Minoan Crete, silver-and-gold bulls' heads with round openings for the wine (permitting wine to pour from the bulls' mouths) seemed particularly common, for several have been recovered from the great palaces (Heraklion Archaeological Museum).

One of the oldest examples of the concept of an animal figure holding a long flat ended conical shaped vessel in hands was known to be discovered from Susa, in Southwestern Iran, in Proto Elamite era about 3rd millennium BC, is a silver figurine of a cow with body of a sitting woman actually offering the vessel between both her bovine hoofs.

Rhyta were very common in ancient Persia, where they were called takuk (تکوک). After a Greek victory against Persia, much silver, gold, and other luxuries, including numerous rhyta, were brought to Athens. Persian rhyta were immediately imitated by Greek artists. Not all rhyta were so valuable; many were simply decorated conical cups in ceramic.

Rhyta are represented in Chinese archaeology.

== Greek symbolism ==
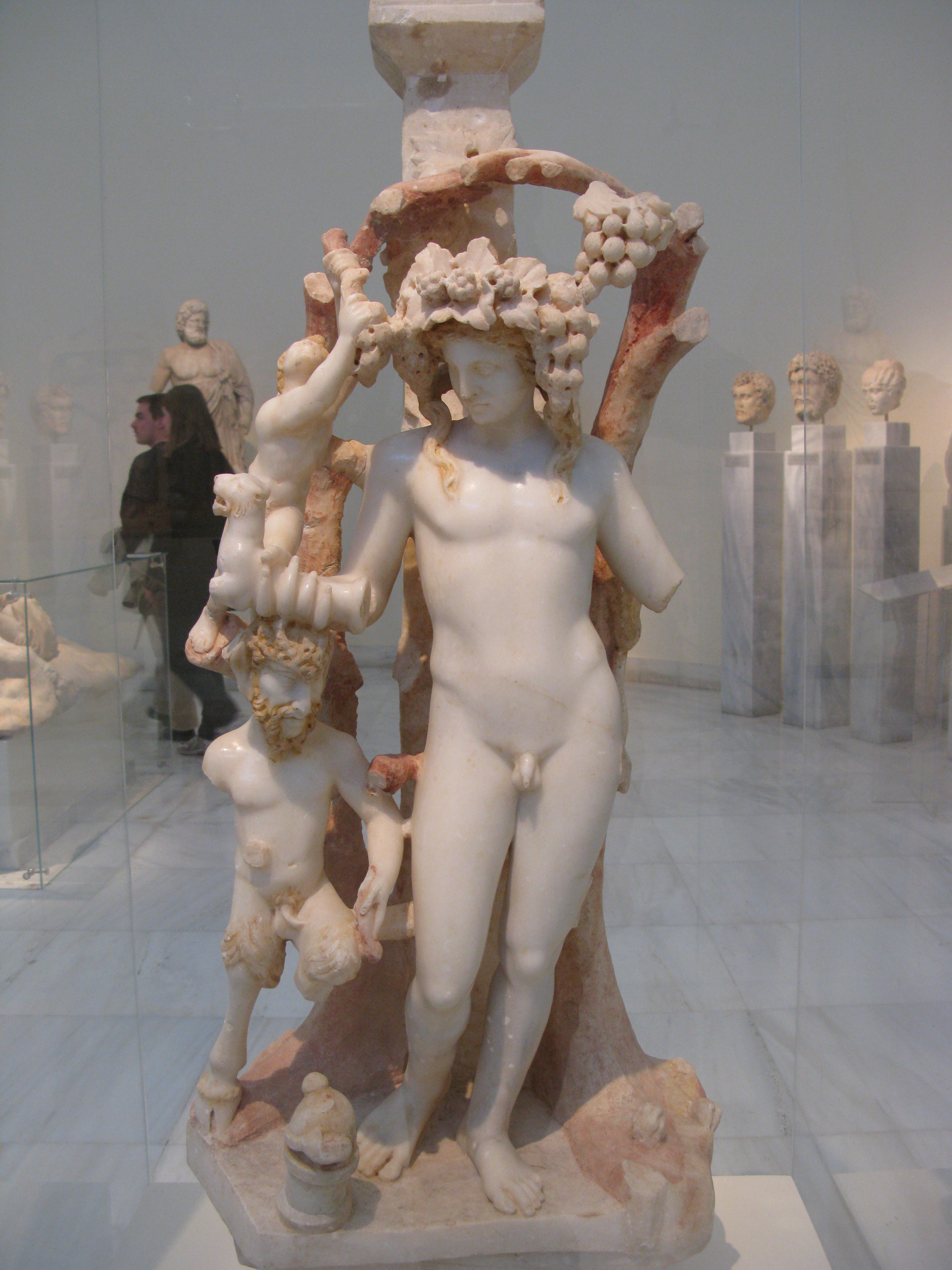
Marble table support adorned by a group including Dionysos, Pan and a Satyr; Dionysos holds a rhyton in the shape of a panther; traces of red and yellow colour are preserved on the hair of the figures and the branches; from an Asia Minor workshop, 170–180 AD, National Archaeological Museum, Athens, Greece

Classical Athenian pottery, such as red-figured vases, are typically painted with themes from mythology. One standard theme depicts satyrs, which symbolize ribaldry, with rhyta and wineskins. The horn-shaped rhyta are carefully woven in composition with the erect male organs of the satyrs, but this blatantly sexual and somewhat humorous theme appears to be a late development, consistent with Athenian humor, as is expressed in the plays of Aristophanes. The ornate and precious rhyta of the great civilizations of earlier times are grandiose rather than ribald, which gives the democratic vase paintings an extra satirical dimension.

The connection of satyrs with wine and rhyta is made in Nonnus's epic Dionysiaca. He describes the satyrs at the first trampling of the grapes during the invention of wine-making by Dionysos:

...the fruit bubbled out red juice with white foam. They scooped it up with oxhorns, instead of cups which had not yet been seen, so that ever after the cup of mixed wine took this divine name of 'Winehorn'.

Károly Kerényi, in quoting this passage, remarks, "At the core of this richly elaborated myth, in which the poet even recalls the rhyta, it is not easy to separate the Cretan elements from those originating in Asia Minor." The connection to which he refers is a pun not present in English translation: the wine is mixed (kerannymenos), which appears to contain the bull's horn (keras), the ancient Greek name of the rhyton.

In the myth, ichor from Olympus falls among rocks. From it grow grapevines. One grows around a pine tree, where a serpent, winding up the tree, eats the grapes. Dionysus, seeing the snake, pursues it into a hole in the rocks. Following an oracle of Rhea, the Cretan mountain goddess, Dionysus hollows out the hole and tramples grapes in it, dancing and shouting. The goddess, the rocks, the snake, and the dancing are Cretan themes. The cult of Dionysus was Anatolian. At its most abstract, the rhyton is the container of the substance of life, celebrated by the ritual dancing on the grapes.

== Gallery ==
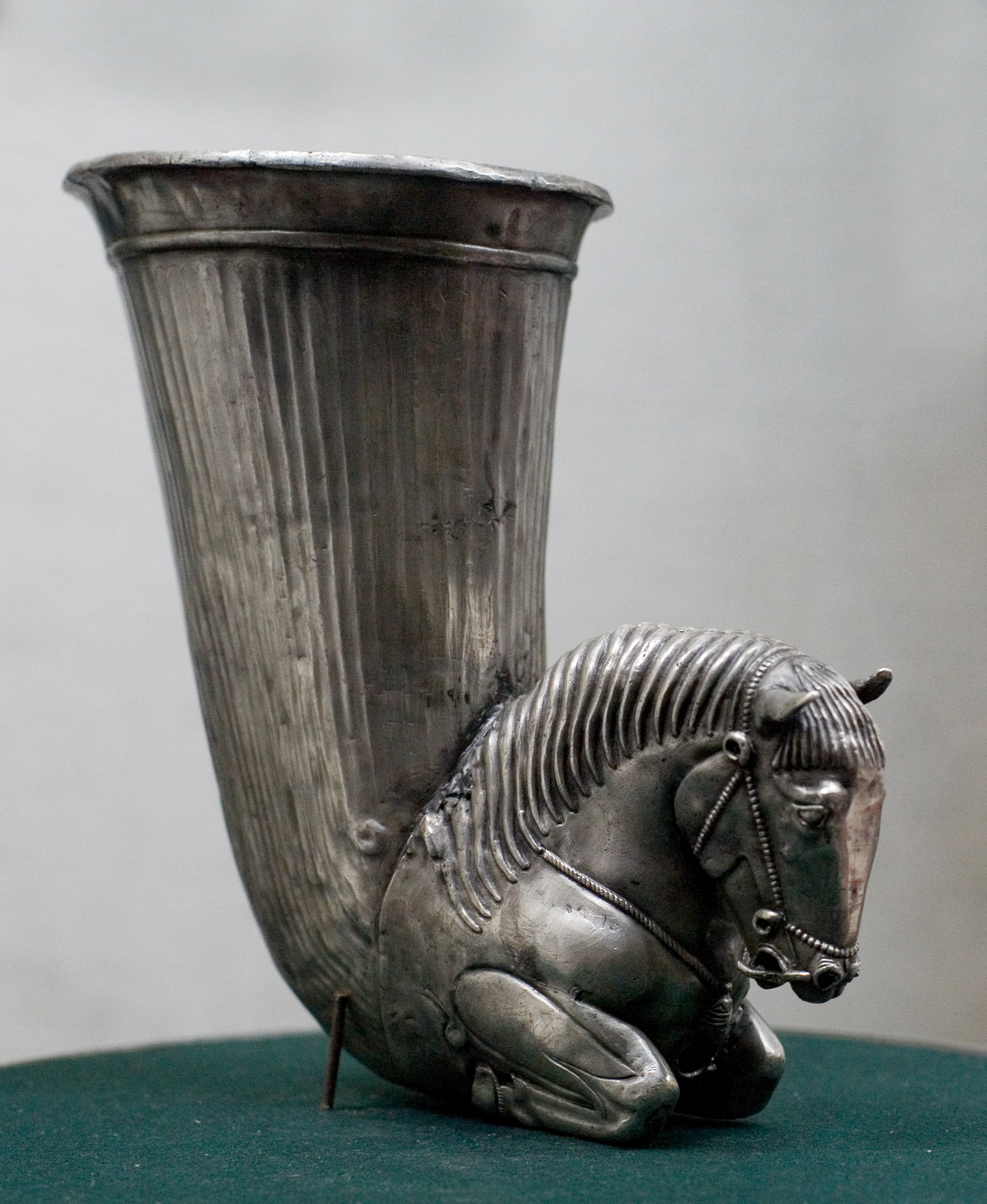
Urartian silver rhyton from Erebuni Fortress

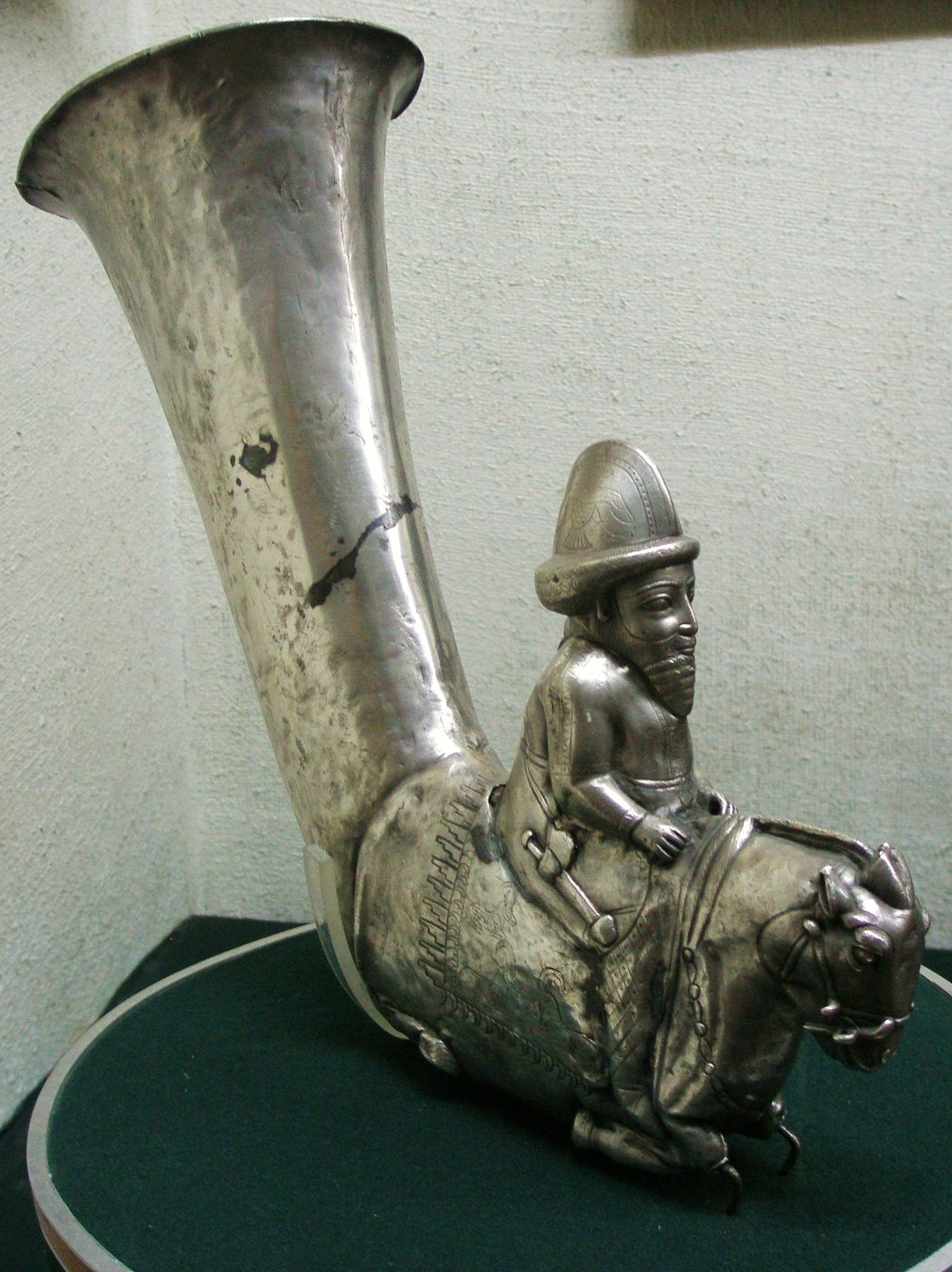
Achaemenid silver rhyton from Erebuni Fortress

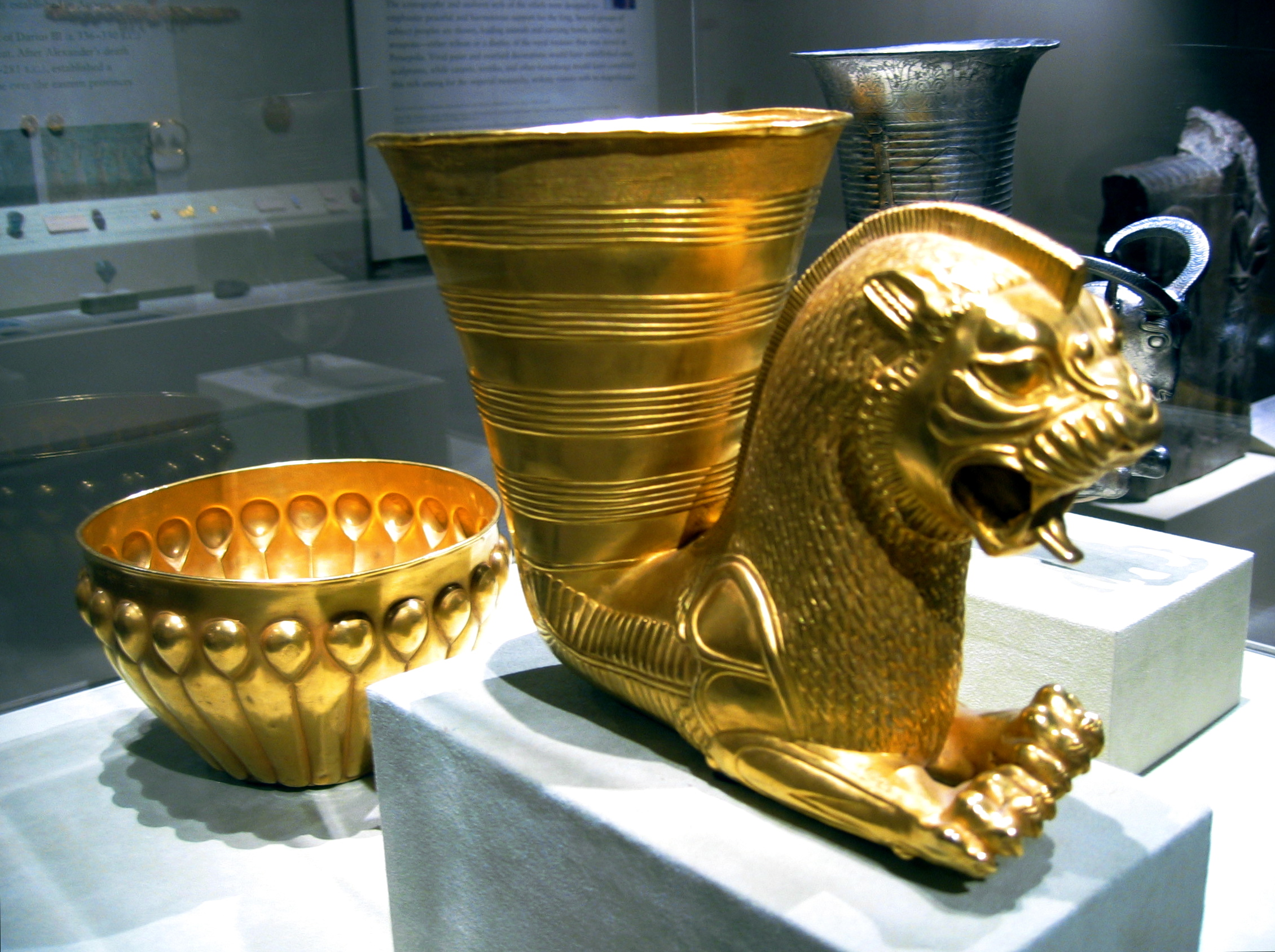
Achaemenid Persian Lion Rhyton, c. 500 BC

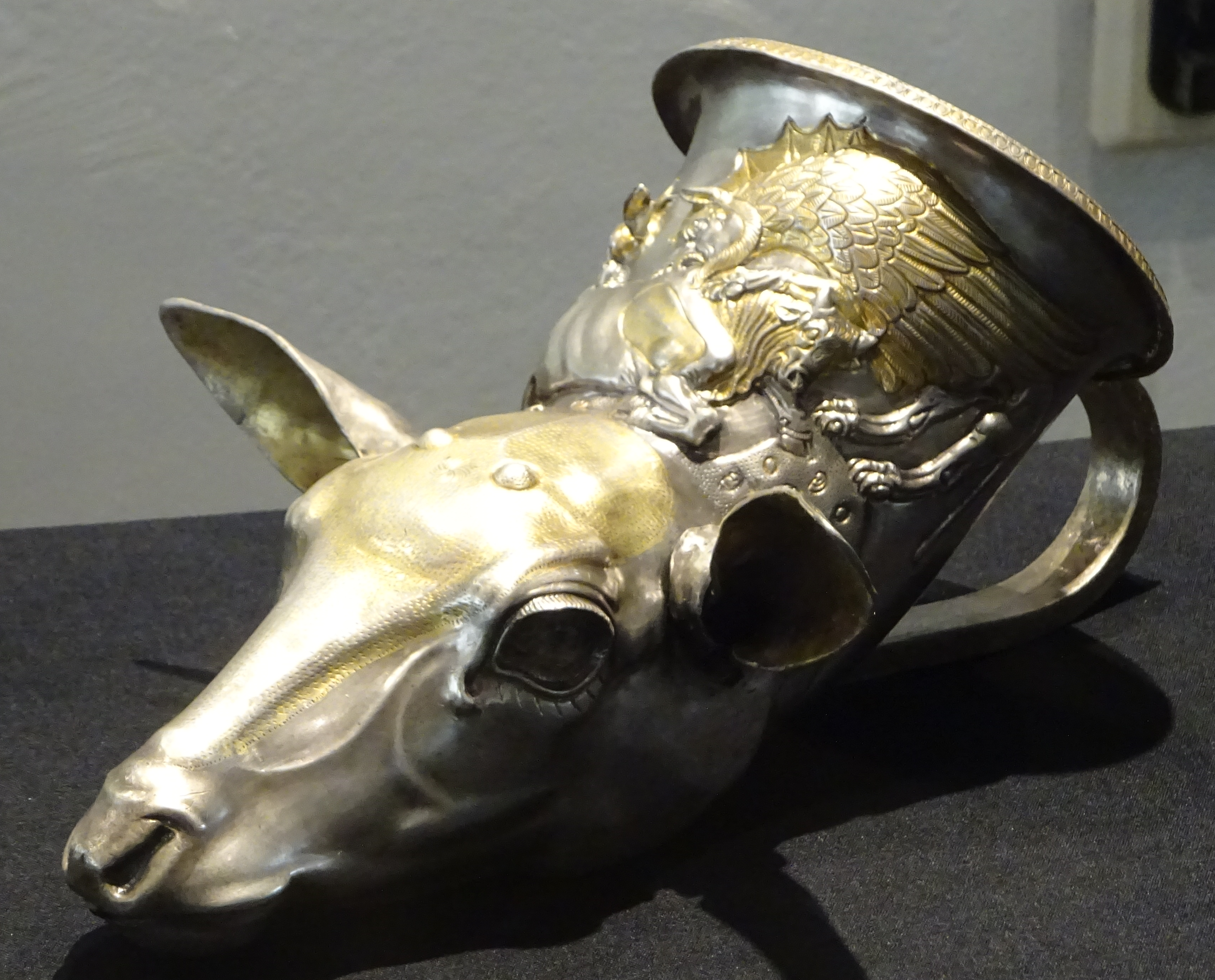
Greek rhyton for the Thracian market, 4th century BC

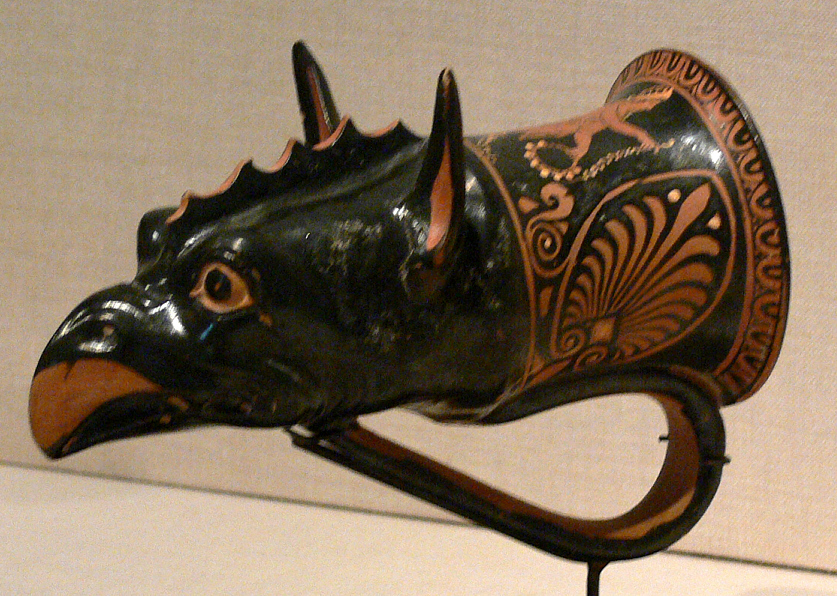
Pottery griffon's head rhyton, Apulia, c. 350–300 BC

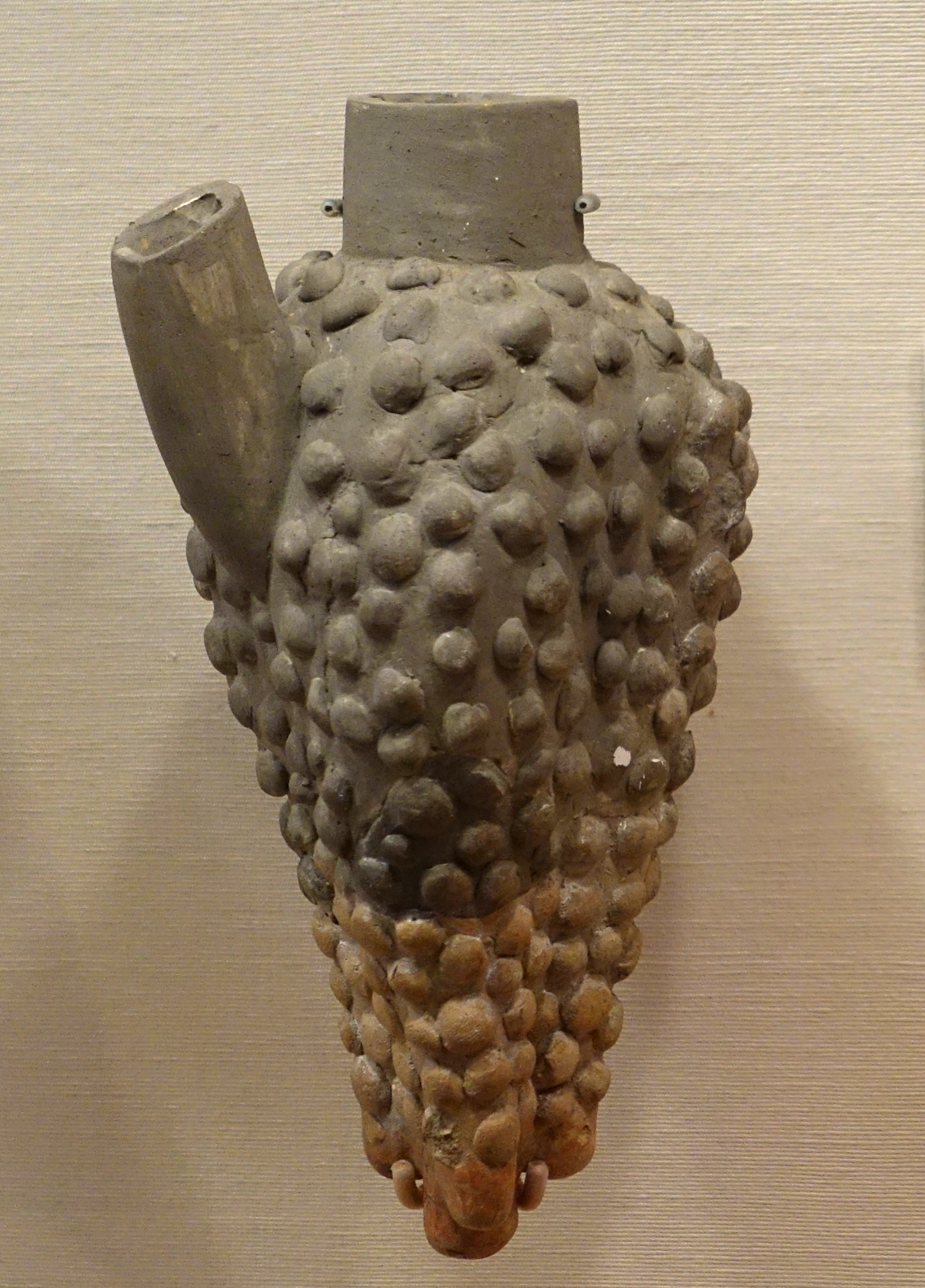
Ceramic ceremonial rhyton in the shape of a grape cluster, Alişar Hüyük, Anatolia, Middle Bronze Age, 1750–1650 BC

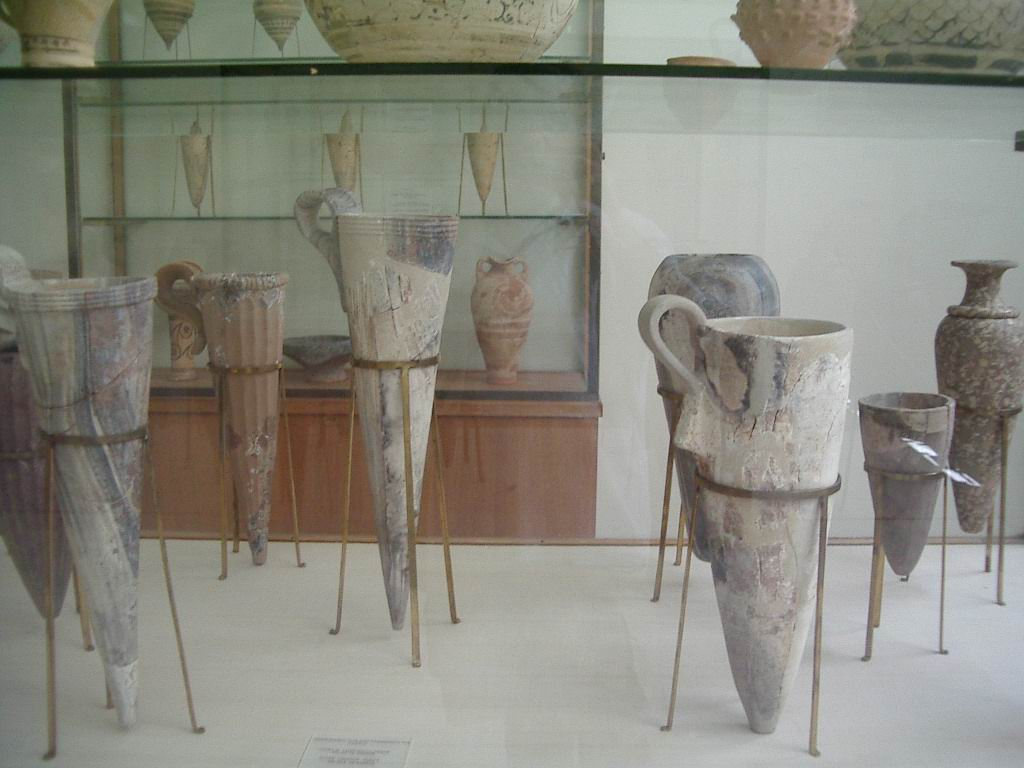
Minoan steatite rhyta in the Heraklion Archaeological Museum

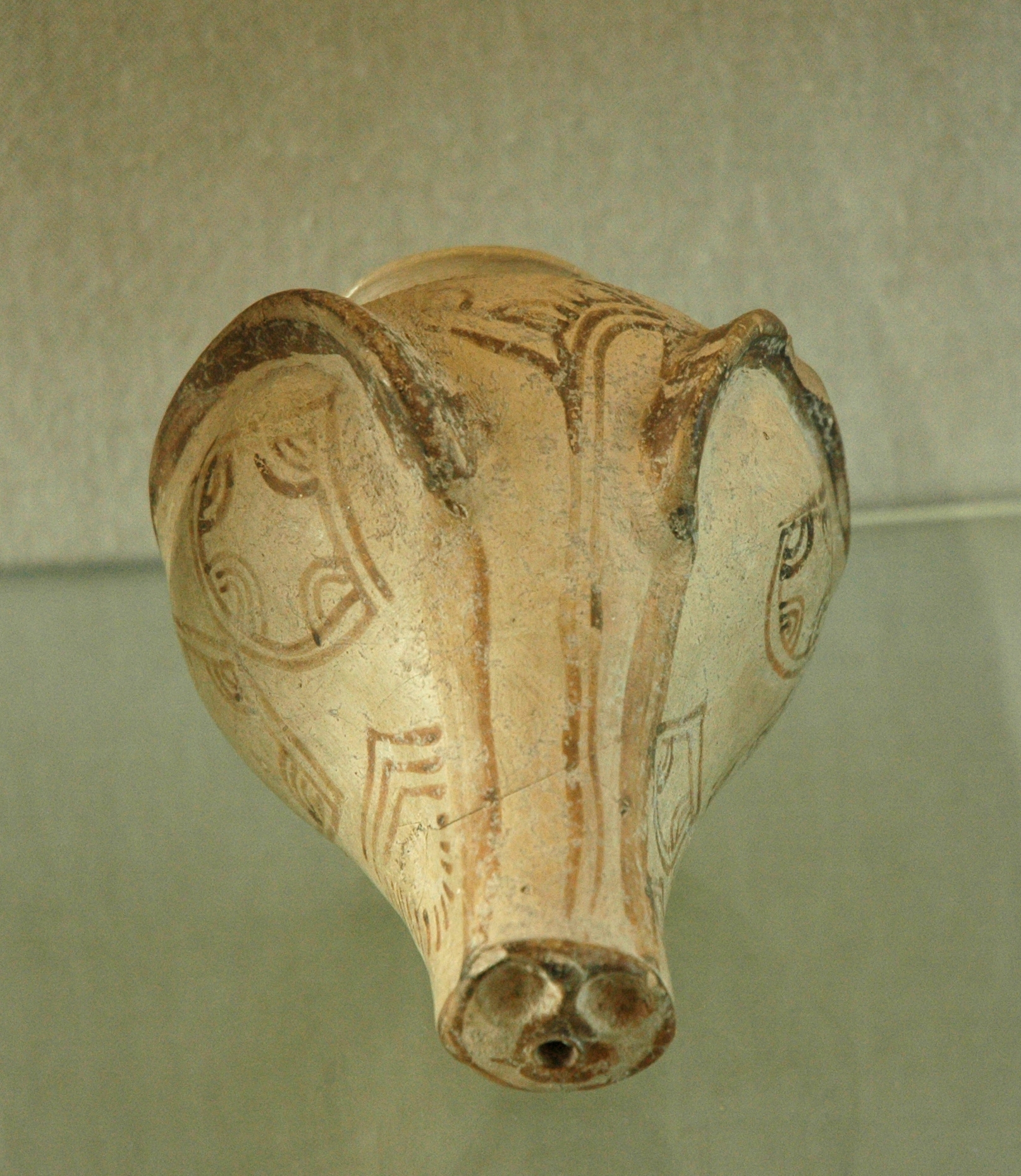
Boar's head rhyton from Ugarit, view from the bottom

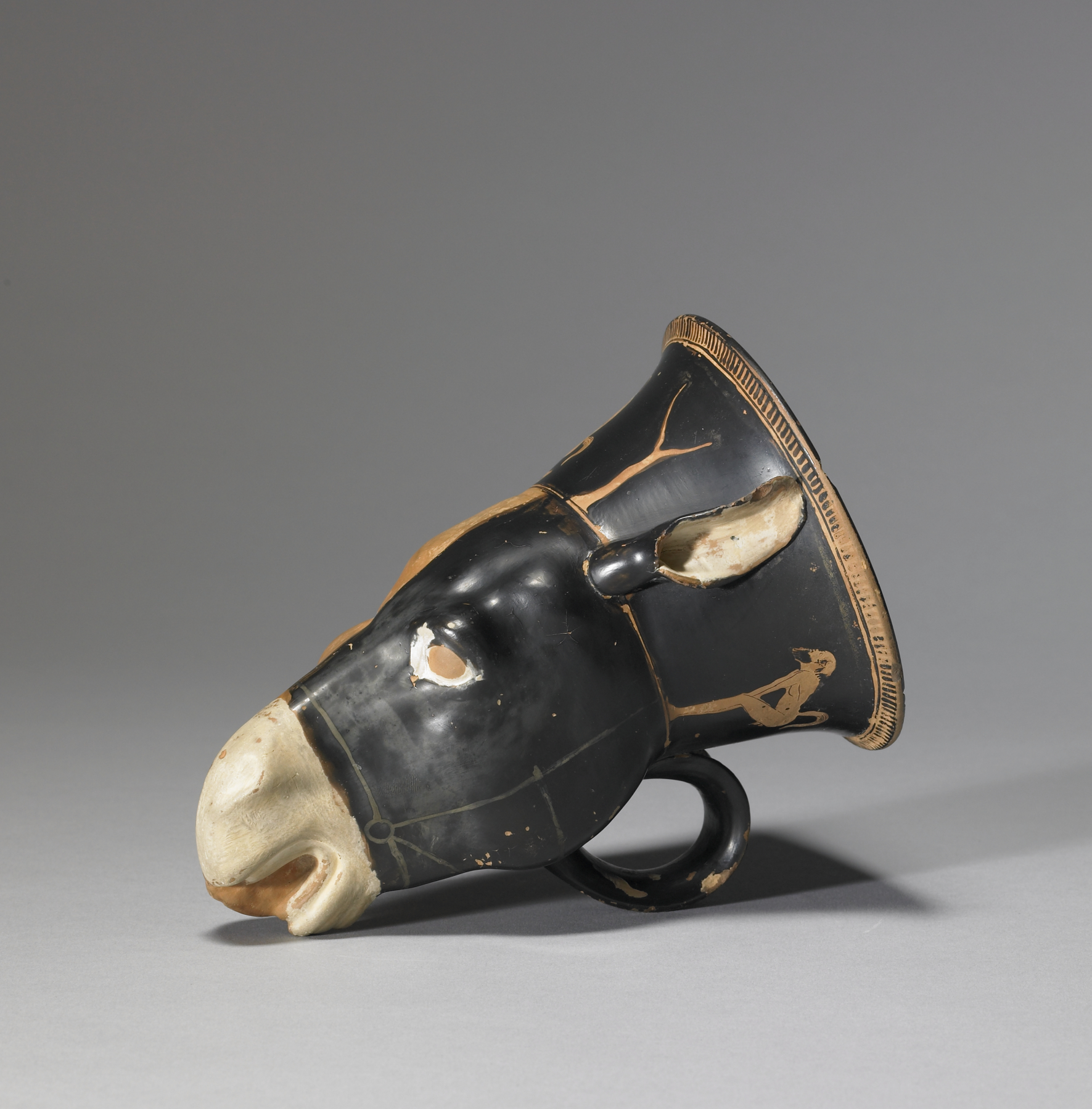
Pottery rhyton, decorated with red-figure satyrs cavorting, c. 450 BC

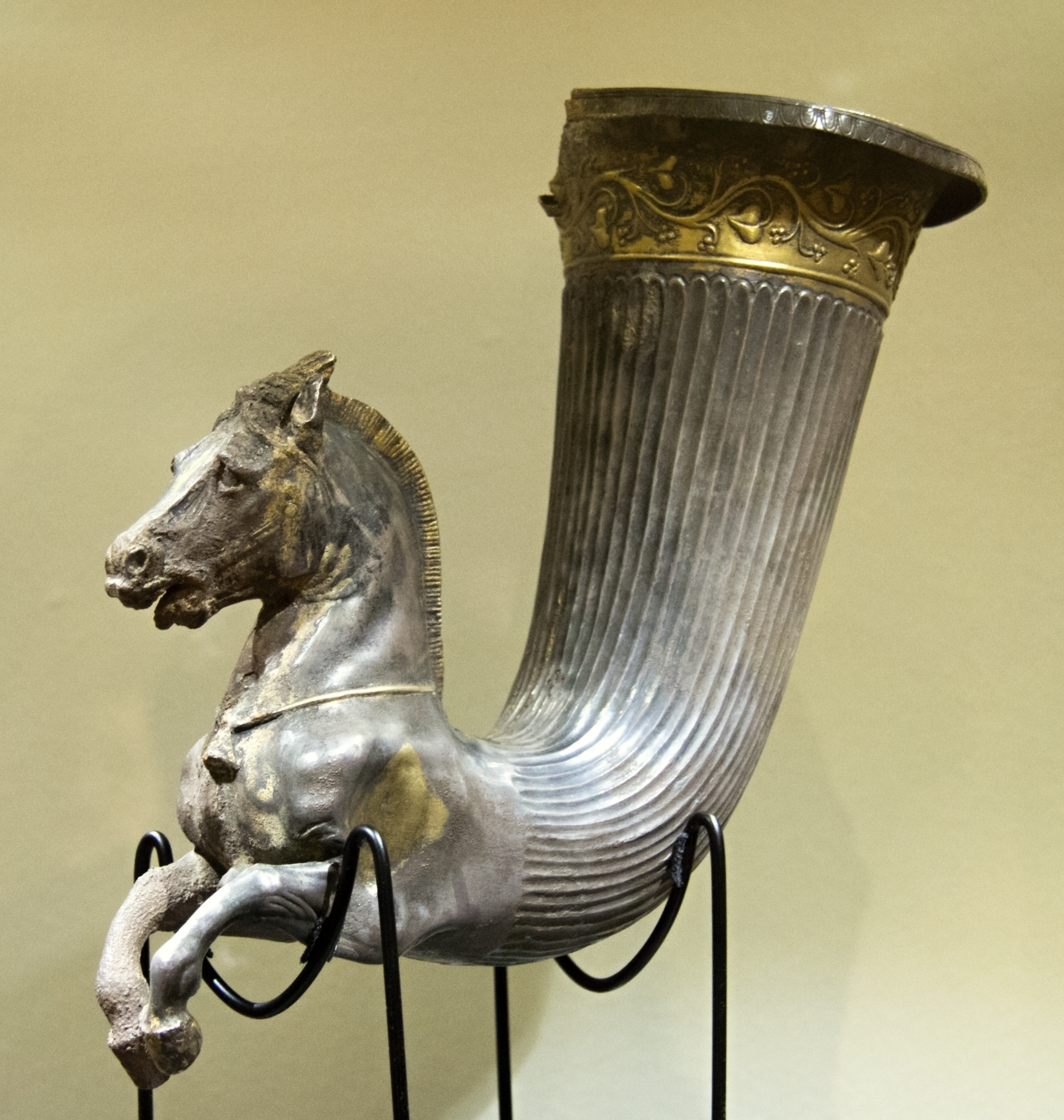
Greek silver rhyton for the Thracian market, end 4th century

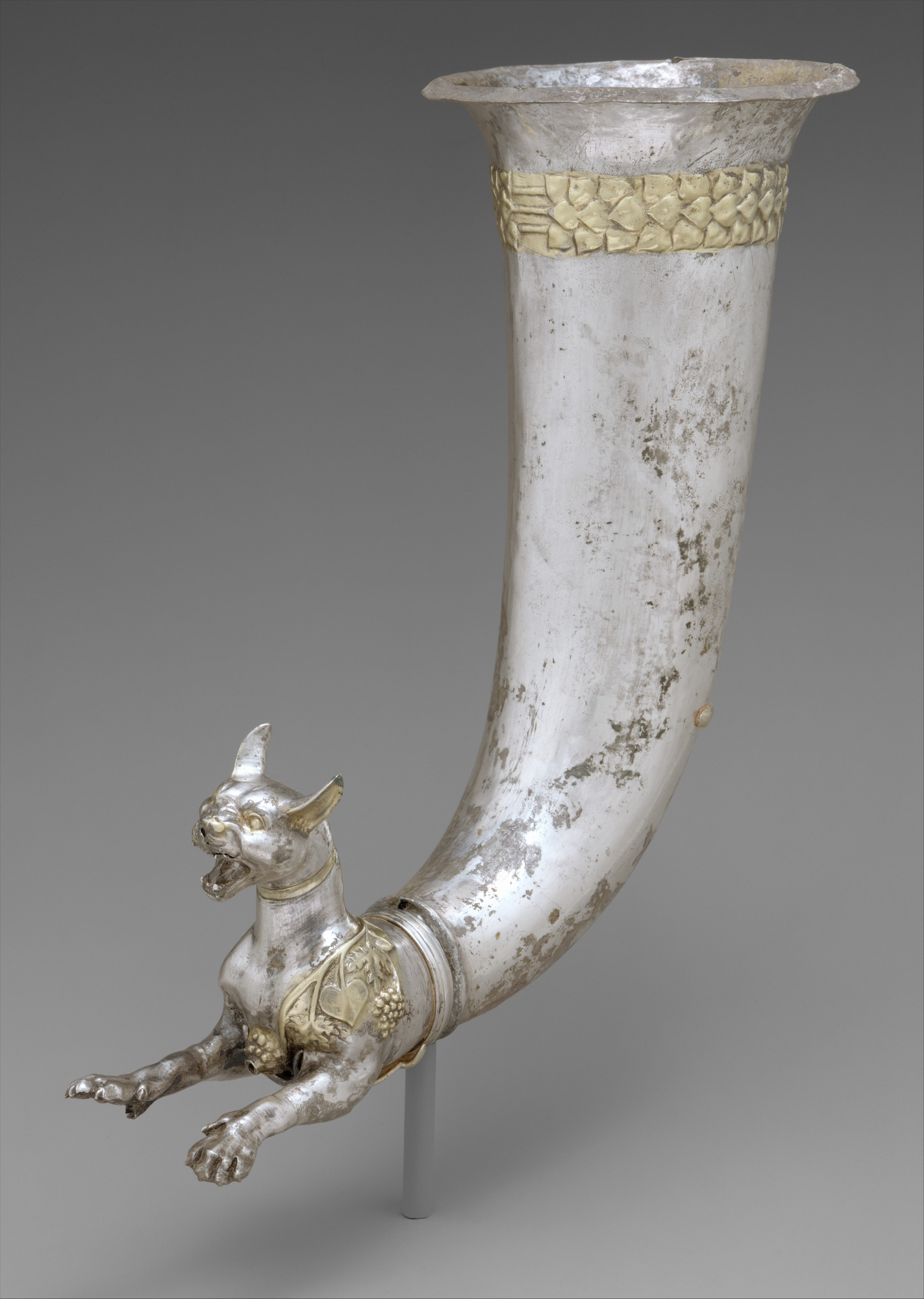
Rhyton terminating in the forepart of a wild cat, 1st century BC, Metropolitan Museum of Art

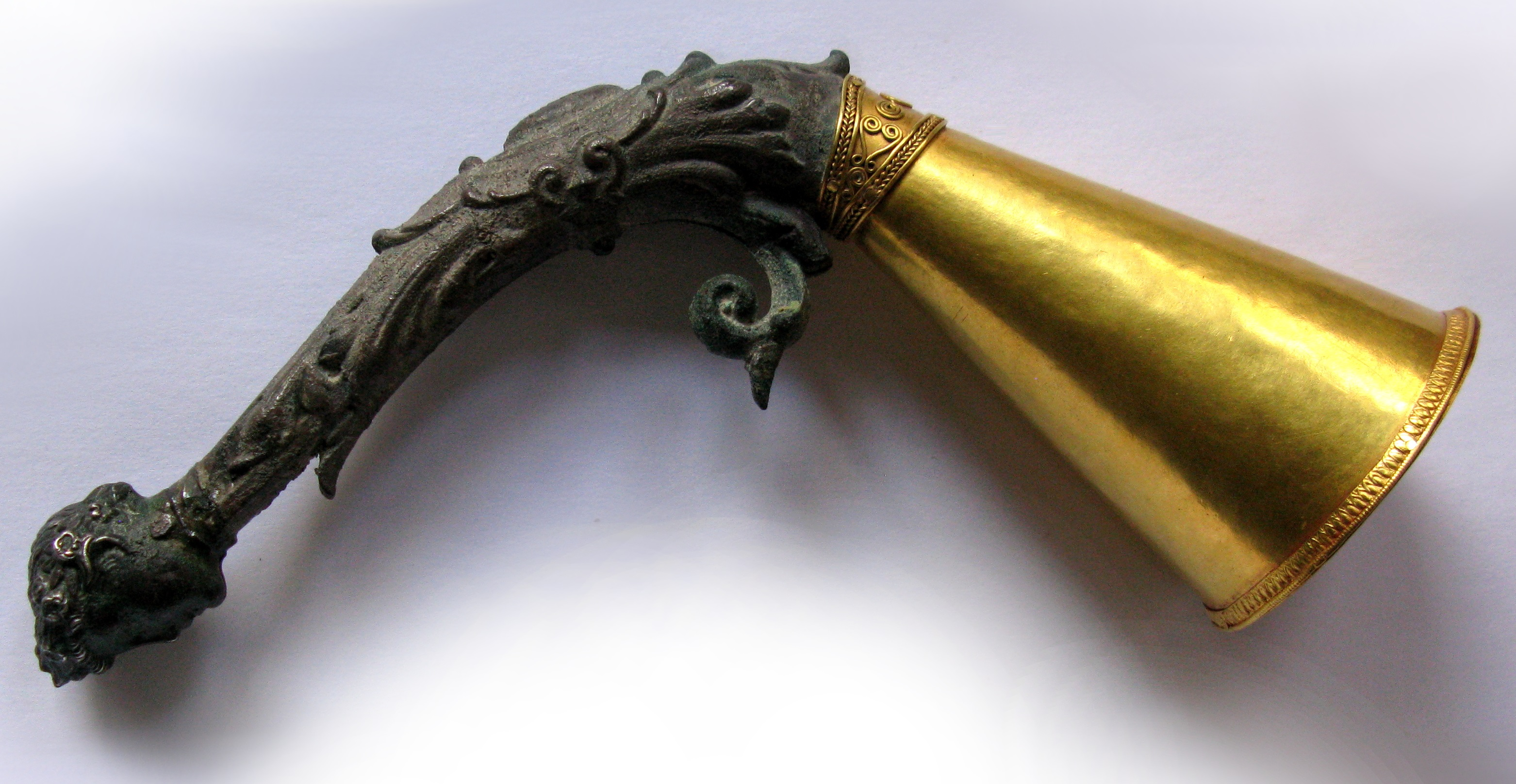
4th century BC Greek gold and bronze drinking horn with head of Dionysus from Tamoikin Art Fund

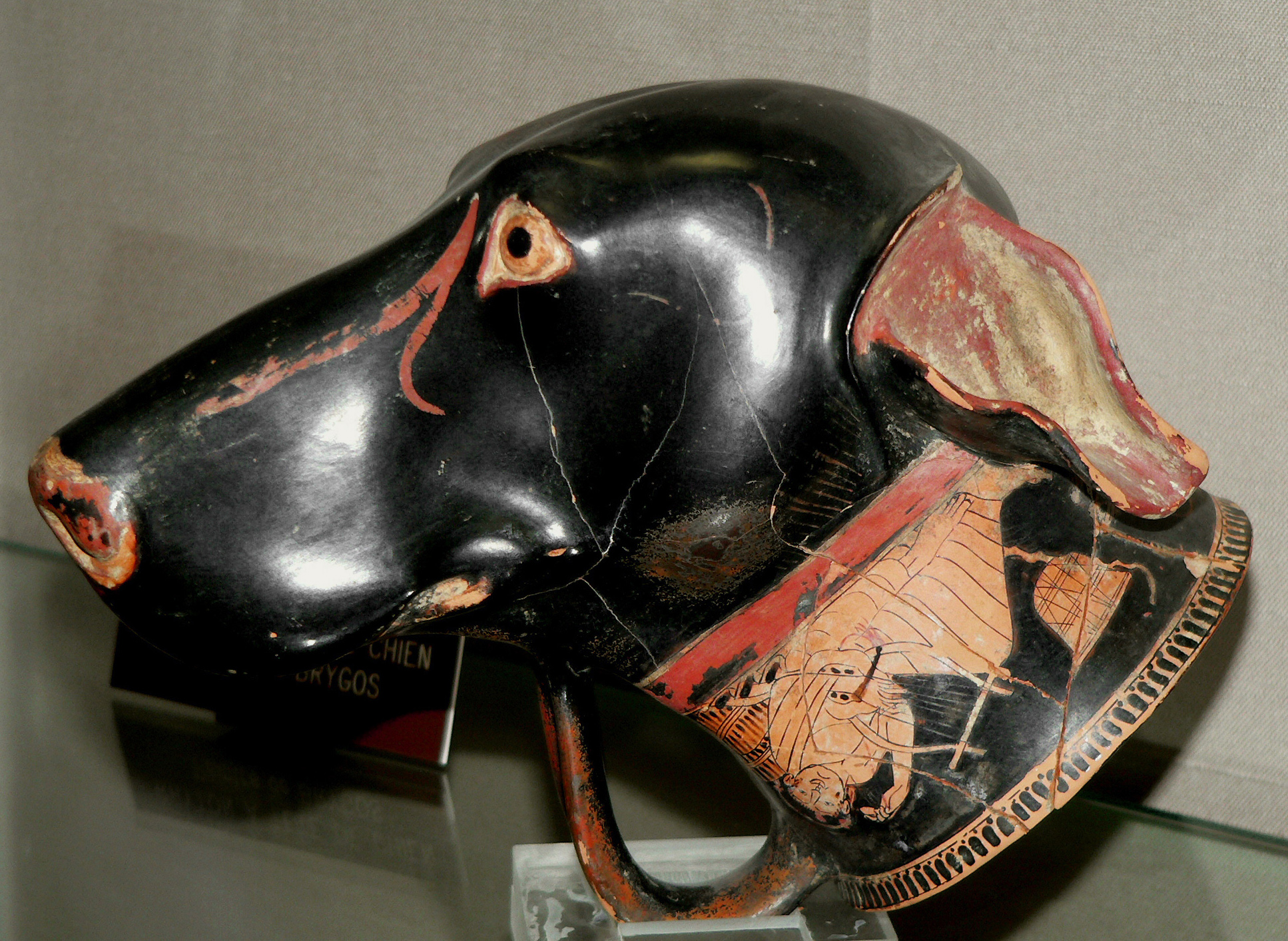
An Ancient Greek rhyton serving vessel in the shape of a dog's head, made by Brygos, early 5th century BC. Jérôme Carcopino Museum, Department of Archaeology, Aleria.

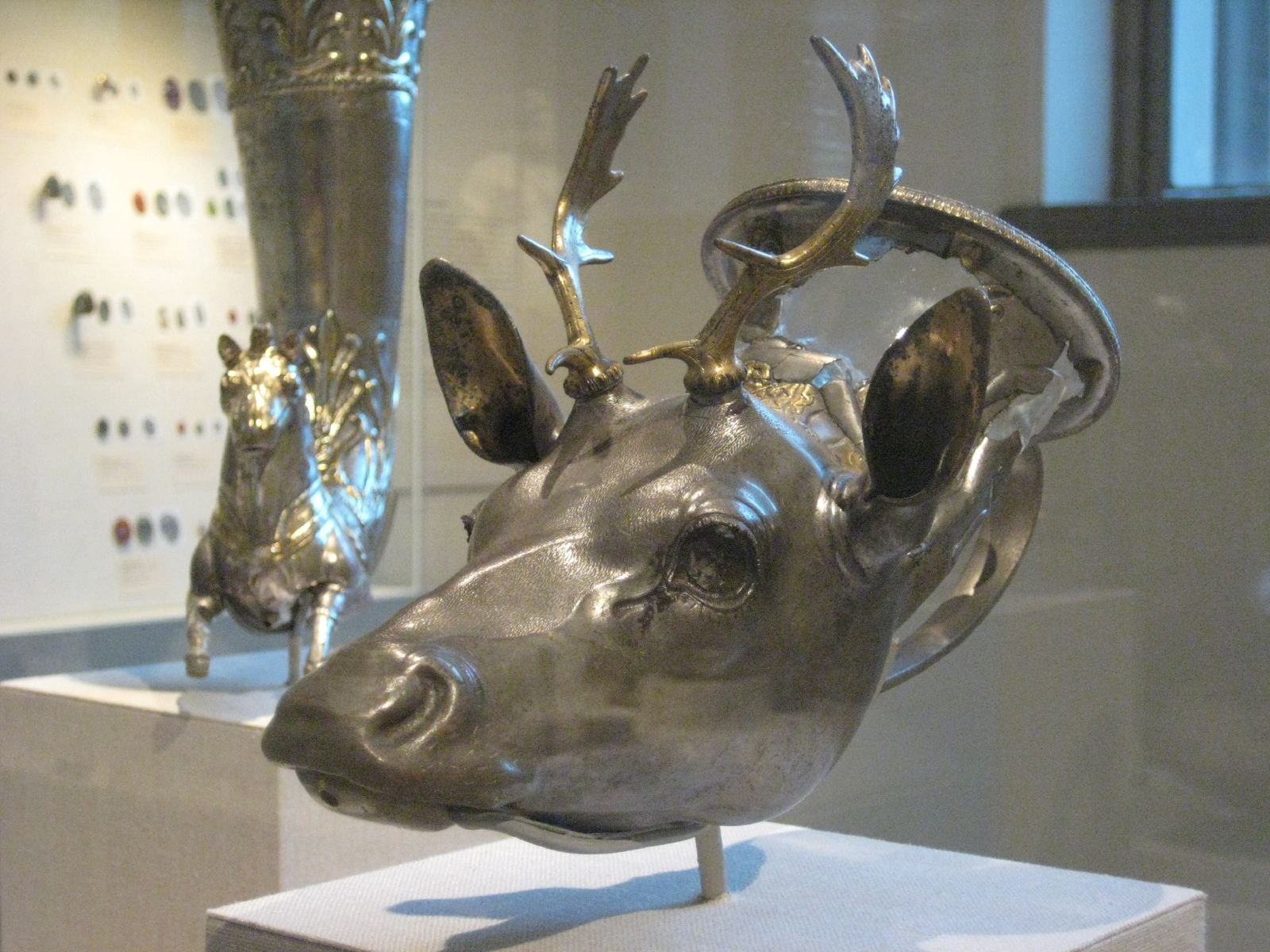
The Stag's Head Rhyton, dating to 400 BCE, the largest known rhyton As of 2021.

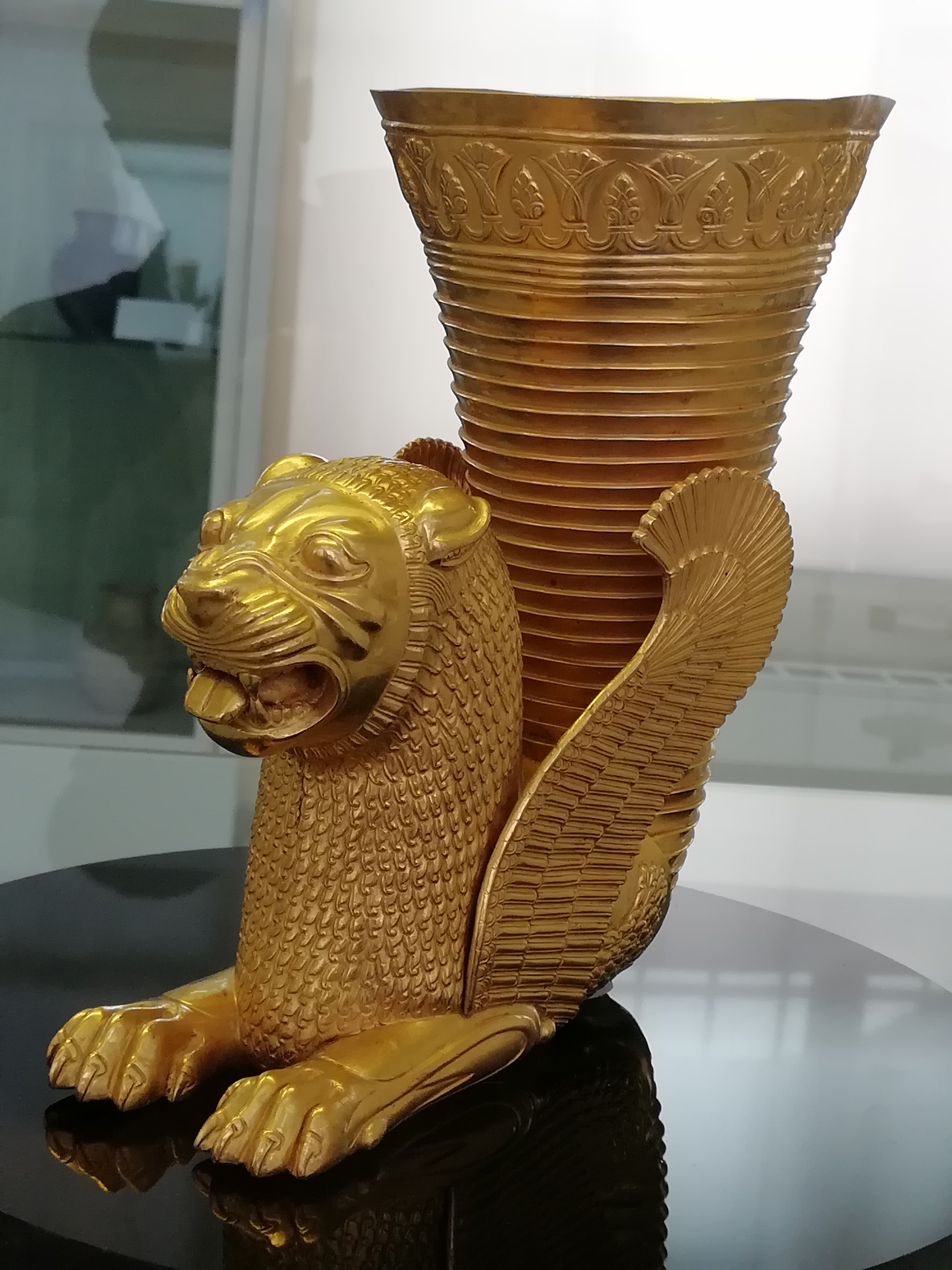
Achaemenid Lion Rhyton from Persepolis, kept at National Museum of Iran.

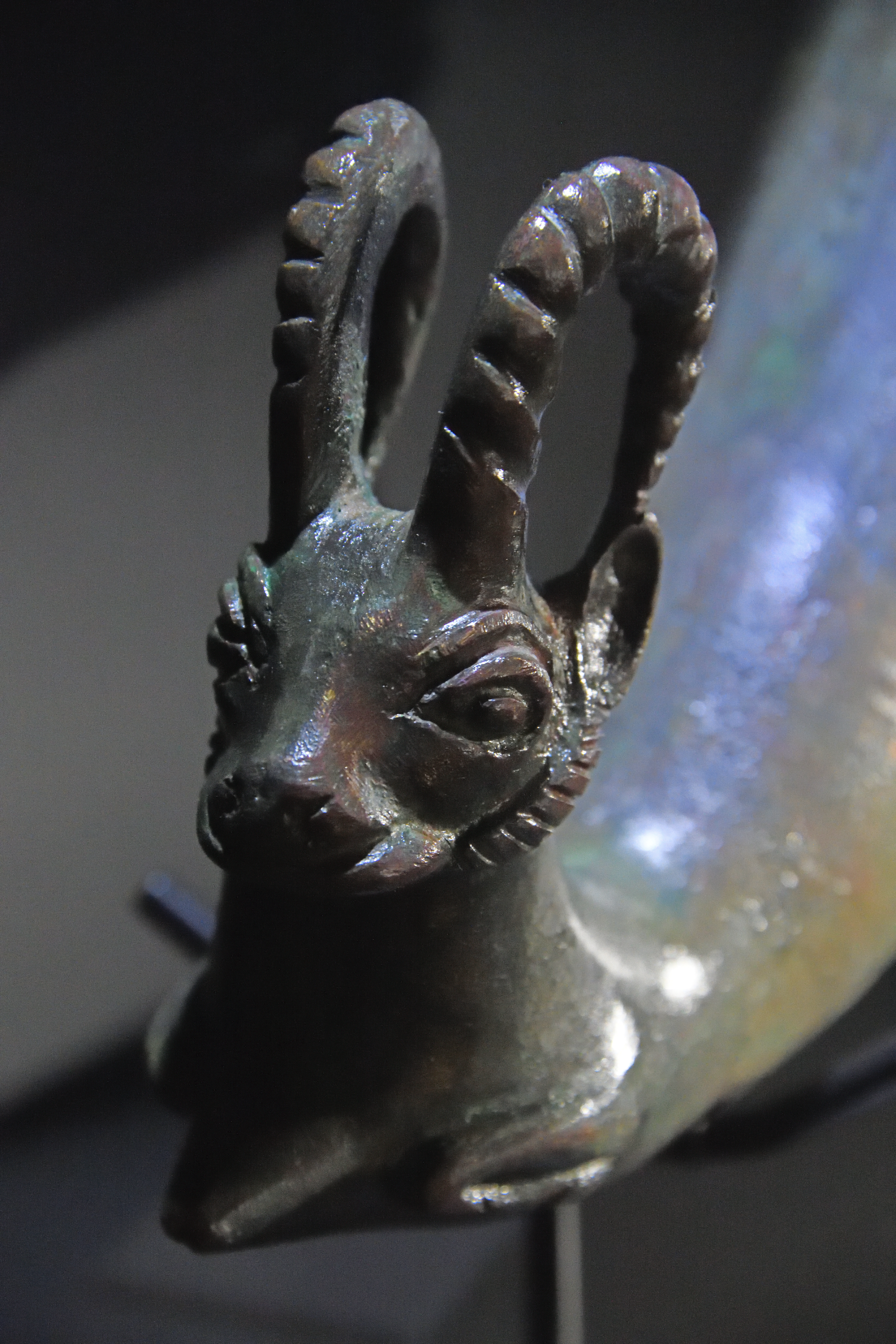
Bronze Rhyton from Iran's Achaemenid period, Erimtan Archaeology and Art Museum.

== See also ==
- Silver Siege Rhyton
- Achaemenid Persian Lion Rhyton
