= Rhyton terminating in the forepart of a wild cat =

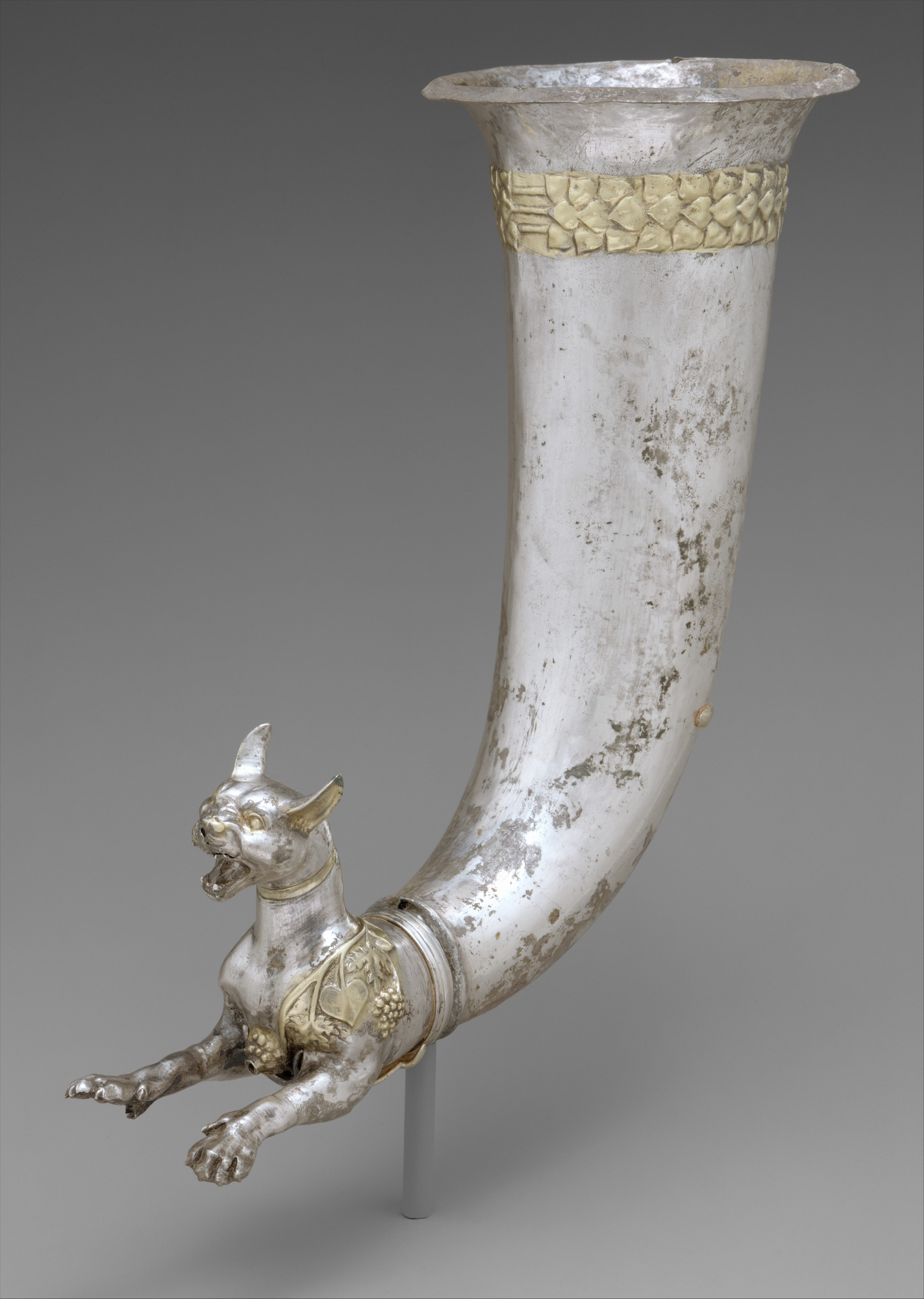
- Year: c. 1st century BC
- Medium: Silver with mercury gilt
- Location: Metropolitan Museum of Art; New York

The Metropolitan Museum of Art has in its collection a 1st-century rhyton terminating in the forepart of a wild cat. The silver drinking vessel, which depicts a wild cat, is attributed to the Parthian Empire.

== Description ==
The rhyton exhibits several hallmarks of Hellenistic art, which were introduced to Iran during the conquests of Alexander the Great. These symbols include dancing women, grapevines, and a panther, all of which are strongly associated with wine-centric Dionysian cults. The Metropolitan Museum of Art describes the work as "a fine example of the enduring influence of Hellenistic culture."
