= Military of Mycenaean Greece =

Overview of military in Mycenaean Greece

Eastern Mediterranean and the Middle East around 1400 BC

The military nature of Mycenaean Greece (c. 1800–1050 BC) in the Late Bronze Age is evident by the numerous weapons unearthed, warrior and combat representations in contemporary art, as well as by the preserved Greek Linear B records. The Mycenaeans invested in the development of military infrastructure with military production and logistics being supervised directly from the palatial centres.

Late Bronze Age Greece was divided into a series of warrior kingdoms, the most important being centered in Mycenae, to which the culture of this era owes its name, Tiryns, Pylos and Thebes. From the 15th century BC, Mycenaean power started expanding towards the Aegean, the Anatolian coast and Cyprus. Mycenaean armies shared several common features with other contemporary Late Bronze Age powers: they were initially based on heavy infantry, with spears, large shields and in some occasions armor. In the 13th century BC, Mycenaean units underwent a transformation in tactics and weaponry and became more uniform and flexible and their weapons became smaller and lighter. Some representative types of Mycenaean armor/weapons were the boar's tusk helmet and the "Figure-of-eight" shield. Moreover, most features of the later hoplite panoply of Classical Greece were already known at this time.

== Role in society ==
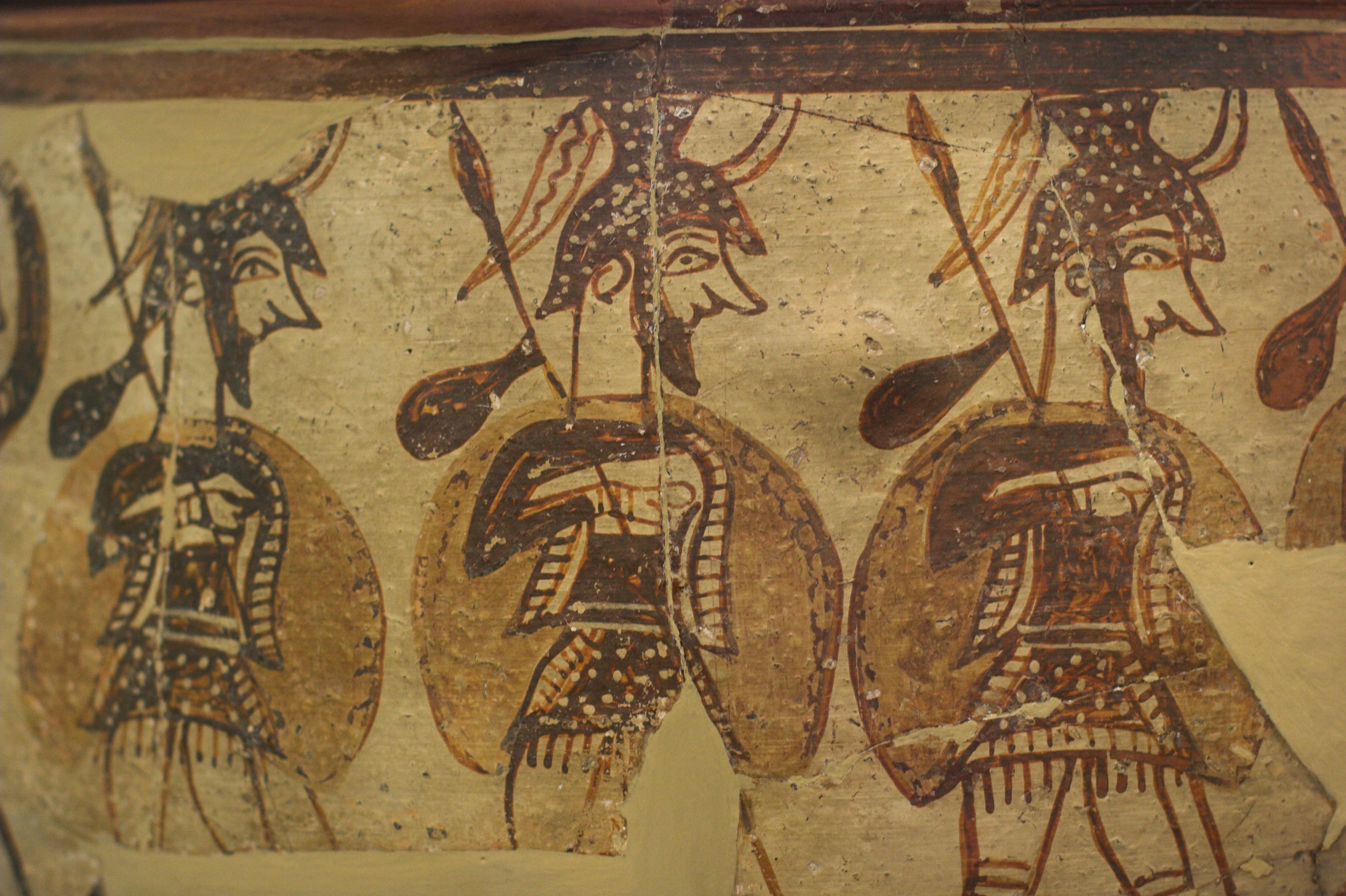
Krater depicting marching soldiers, Mycenae, c. 1200 BC.

War played an important role in Mycenaean society. Material remains such as defensive architecture and weaponry show that they invested heavily in military infrastructure. The value placed on war is evidenced by artistic depictions of combat as well as the fact that elites were often buried with weapons.

Linear B texts are another important source of information about the role of warfare in Mycenaean society. Tablets show that military production and logistics were supervised by a central authority from the palaces. According to the records in the palace of Pylos, every rural community (the damos) was obliged to supply a certain number of men who had to serve in the army; similar service was also performed by the aristocracy. The tablets also record the names of gods associated with war, including Ares (Linear B: A-re) and Athena Potnia (Linear B: A-ta-na Po-ti-ni-ja).

== Tactics and evolution ==
Mycenaean armies shared several common features with other significant Late Bronze Age powers: they were initially based on heavy infantry, which bore pikes, large shields and, in some occasions, armor. Later in the 13th century BC, Mycenaean warfare underwent major changes both in tactics and weaponry. Armed units became more uniform and flexible, while weapons became smaller and lighter. The spear remained the main weapon among Mycenaean warriors until the collapse of the Bronze Age, while the sword played a secondary role in combat.

The precise role and contribution of war chariots in battlefield is a matter of dispute due to the lack of sufficient evidence. In general, it appears that during the first centuries (16th–14th century BC) chariots were used as a fighting vehicle while later in the 13th century BC their role was sometimes limited to a battlefield transport particularly for light chariots while heavy ones were probably used with cavalry. Horse-mounted warriors were also part of the Mycenaean armies, however their precise role isn't clear due to lack of archaeological data. Also during this time the phalanx began to see its first use in warfare.

== Fortifications ==
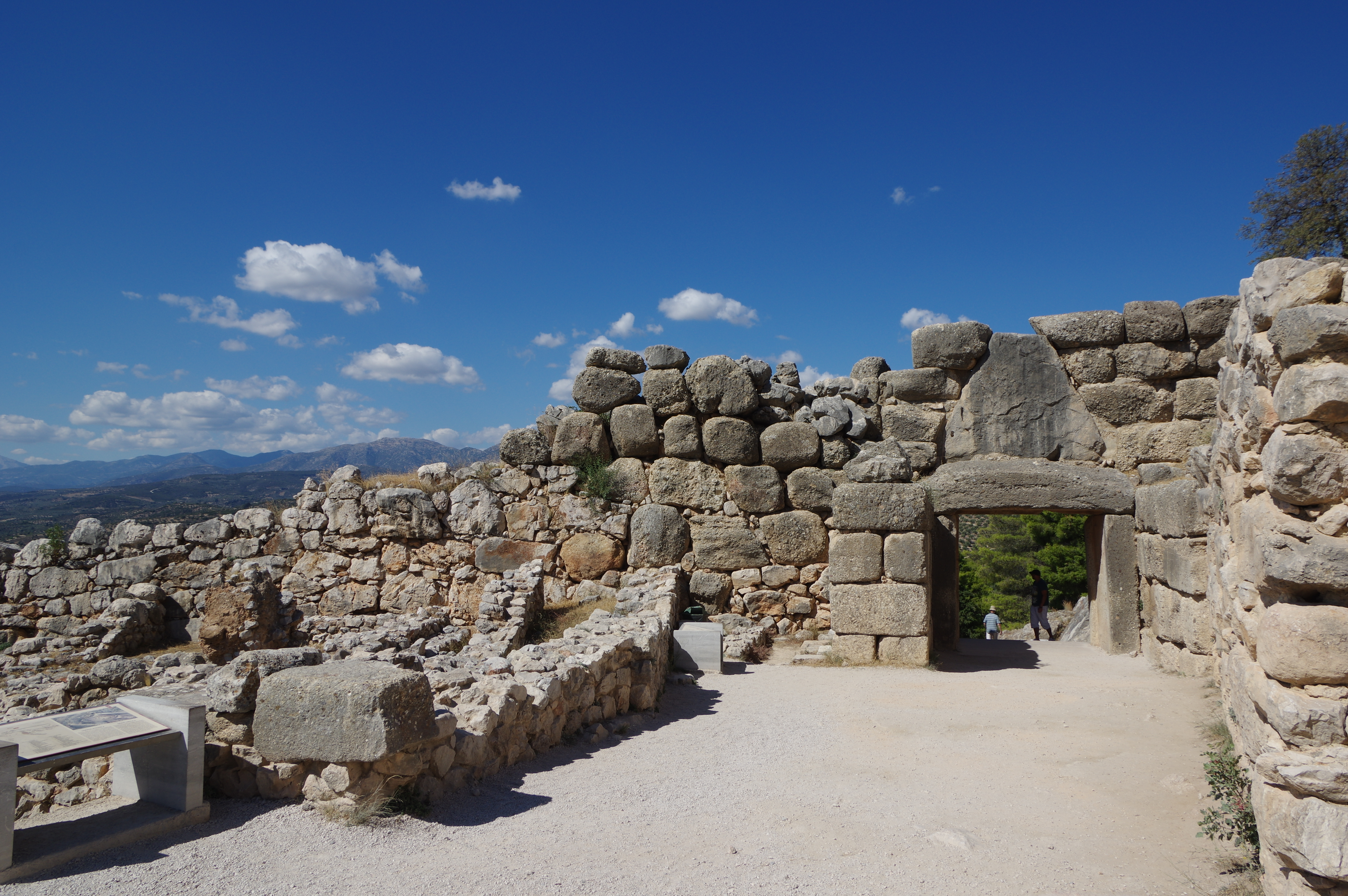
Cyclopean masonry, backside of the Lion Gate in Mycenae

The construction of defensive structures was closely linked with the establishment of the palatial centers in mainland Greece. The principal Mycenaean centers were well-fortified and usually situated on an elevated terrain, such as in Athens, Tiryns and Mycenae or on coastal plains, in the case of Gla. Mycenaean Greeks appreciated the symbolism of war as expressed in defensive architecture, thus they aimed also at the visual impressiveness of their fortifications. The walls were built in Cyclopean style; consisted of walls built of large, unworked boulders more than 8 m (26 ft) thick and weighing several metric tonnes. The term Cyclopean was derived by the Greeks of the classical era who believed that only the mythical giants, the Cyclops, could have constructed such heavy megalithic structures. On the other hand, cut stone masonry is used only in and around gateways.

== Weaponry ==
=== Offensive weapons ===
Spears were initially long and two-handed, more than 3 m (10 ft) long. During the later Mycenaean centuries, shorter versions were adopted which were usually accompanied with small types of shields, mainly of circular shape. These short spears have been used for both thrusting and throwing.

From the 16th century BC, swords with rounded tips appeared, having a grip which was an extension of the blade. They were 130 cm (4 ft) long and 3 cm (1 in) broad. Another type, the single-edged sword was a solid piece of bronze c. 66 cm (2.17 ft)–74 cm (2.43 ft) long. This shorter sword was most probably used for close-quarters combat. In the 14th century BC, both types were progressively modified with stronger grips and shorter blades. Finally in the 13th century BC, a new type of sword, the Naue II, became popular in Mycenaean Greece.

Archery was commonly used from an early period in battlefield. Other offensive weapons used were maces, axes, slings and javelins.

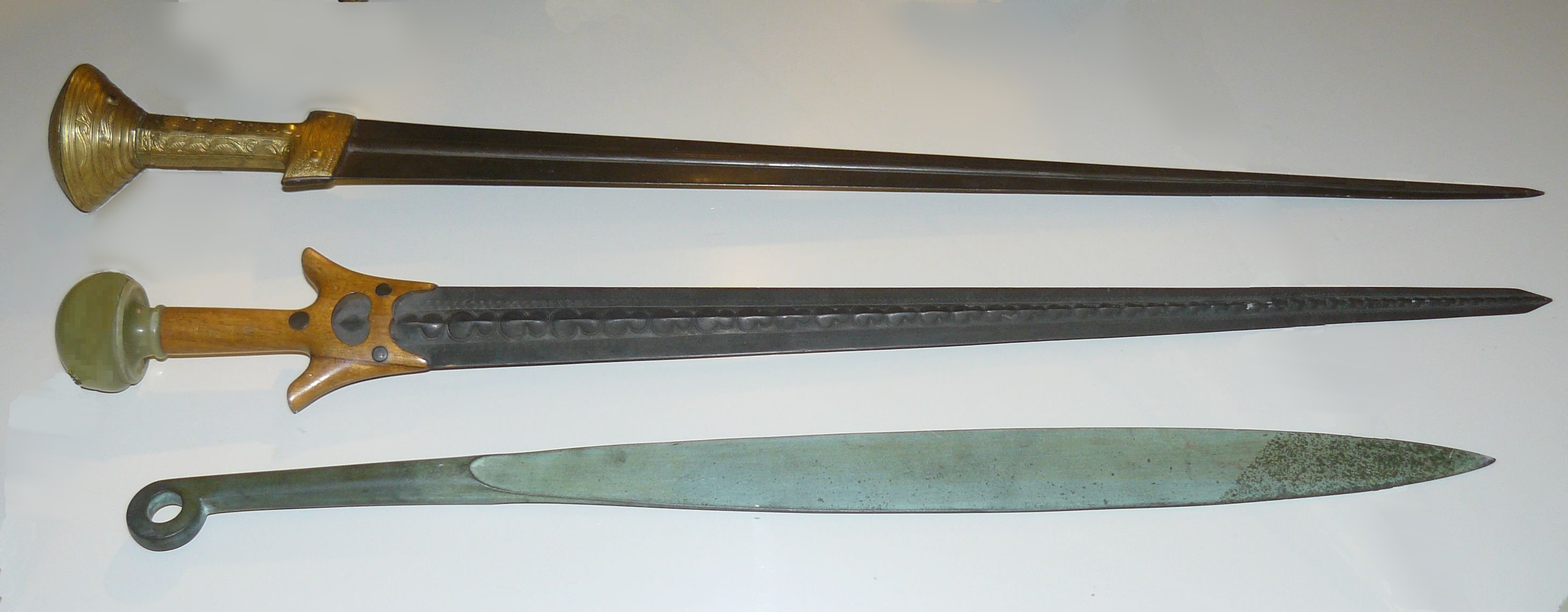
Reconstructed Mycenaean swords

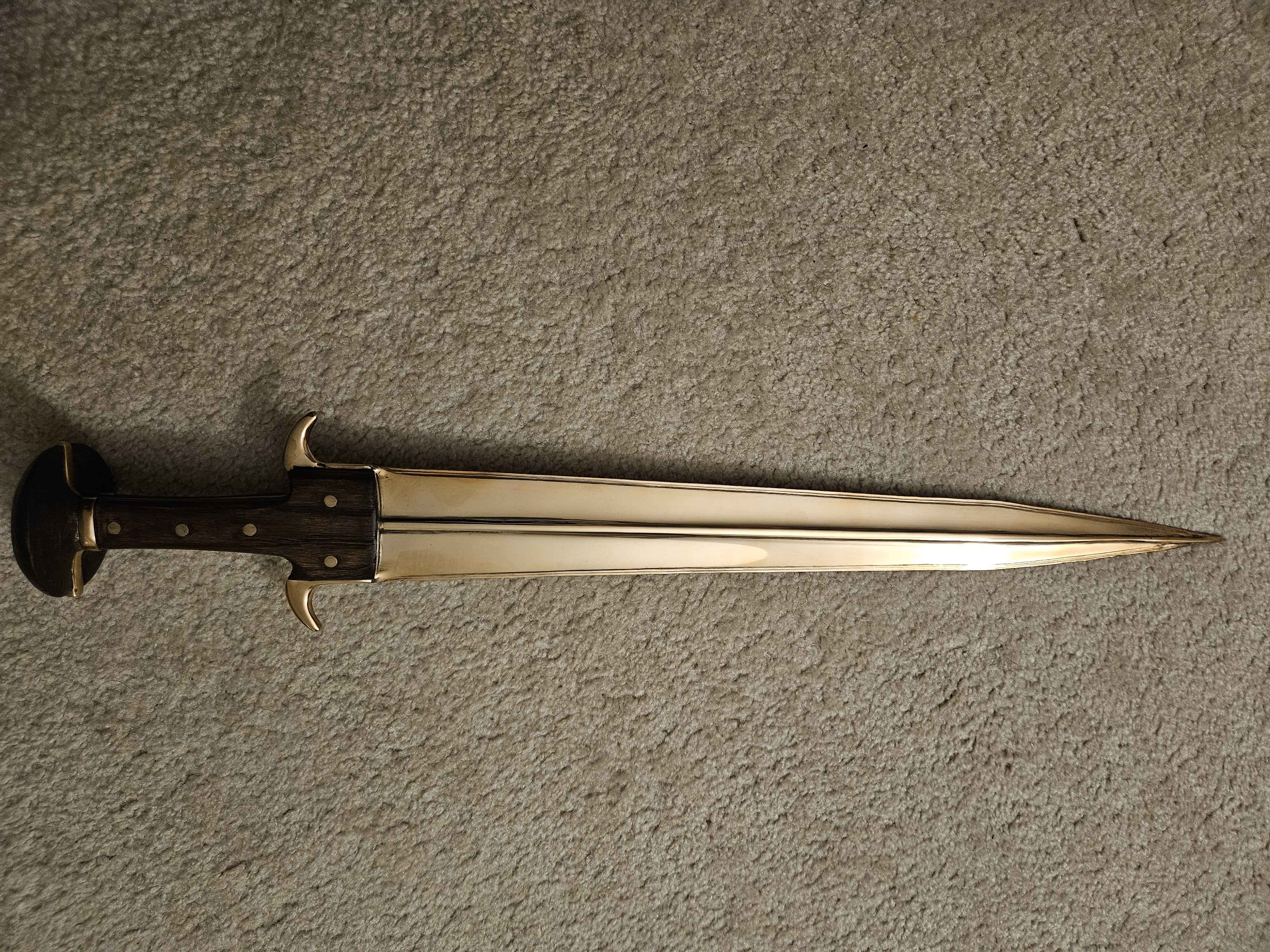
Replica of a Mycenaean Type G Bronze Sword

=== Shields ===
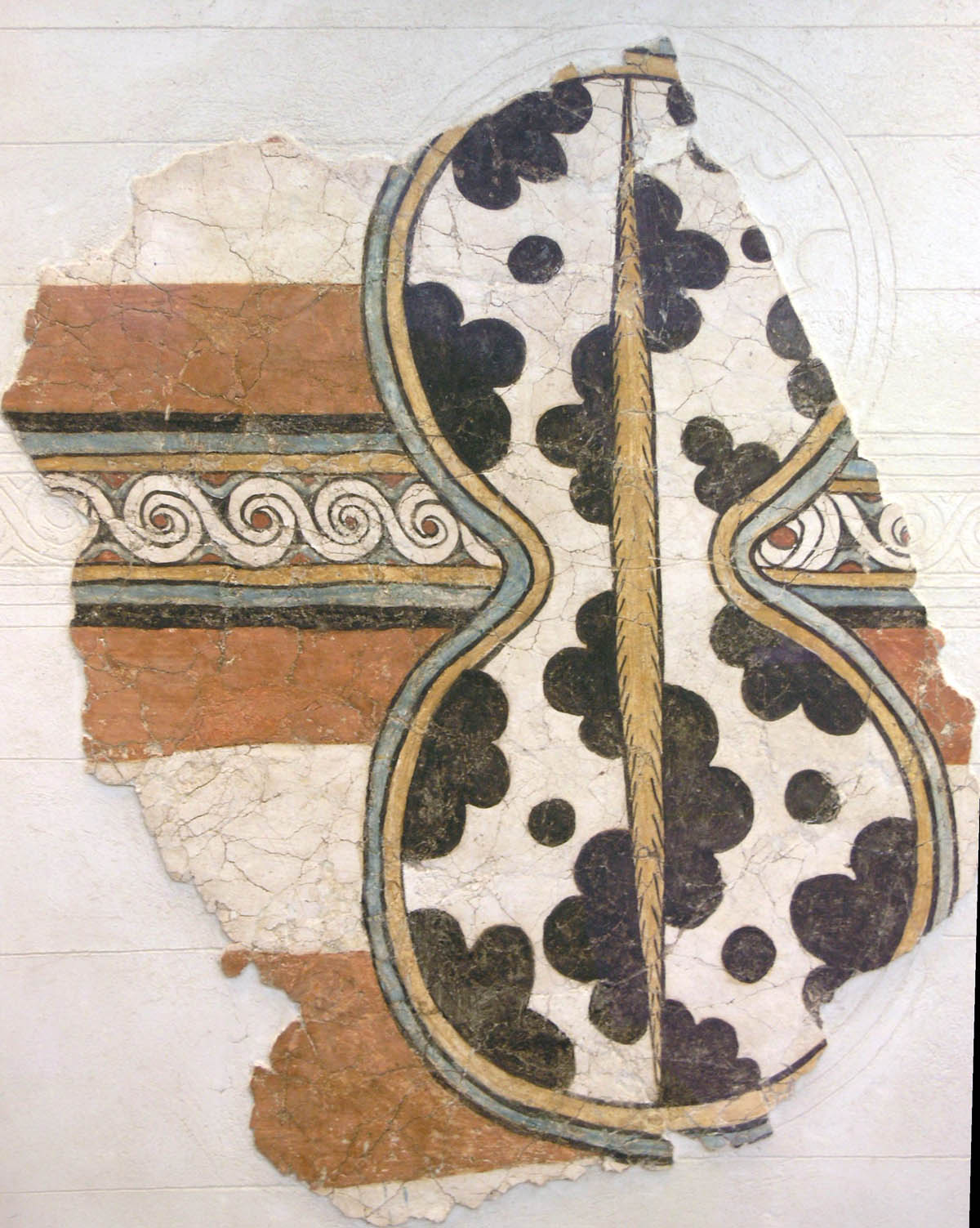
Fresco depicting a "figure-of-eight" shield, Mycenae

Early Mycenaean armies used "tower shields", large shields that covered almost the entire body. This shields were 'worn' over their backs into battle and lacked any means for the defender to manipulate them by hand. This led to a tactic depicted in the artwork of swordsmen grabbing the opponent's shield and pushing it in order to push the shield into the back of their opponent's knees to unbalance them. However, with the introduction of bronze armor, this type was less utilized, even if it didn't completely go into disuse, as attested in iconography. "Figure-of-eight" shields became the most common type of Mycenaean shields. These shields were made of several layers of bull-hide and in some cases they were reinforced with bronze plates. During the later Mycenaean period, smaller types of shields were adopted. They were either of completely circular shape, made of bronze, and were early hoplon or aspis shields, or were a predecessor shield which is almost circular with a cut-out part from their lower edge. These latter shields were crescent shaped and made of several layers of leather with a bronze boss and reinforcements, and are the first known shields of Mycenaean design that could be manipulated by hand. Their invention coincided with the entrance of Mycenae onto the world stage in the late 1300s and early 1200s. They occasionally appear to have been made entirely of bronze. In the later Mycenaean culture, armies used "crescent shields" which were used on horseback as they curved around the body of a horse being ridden, but covered much of the rider's body.

=== Armour ===
A representative piece of Mycenaean armor is the Dendra panoply (c. 1450–1400 BC) which consisted of a cuirass of a complete set made up of several elements of bronze. It was flexible and comfortable enough to be used for fighting on foot, while the total weight of the armor is around 18 kg (about 40 lb). Important evidence of Mycenaean armor has also been found in Thebes (c. 1350–1250 BC), which include a pair of shoulder guards, smaller than those from Dendra, with additional plates protecting the upper arms, attached to the lower edge of the shoulder guards.

The use of scale armour is evident during the later Mycenaean centuries, as shown on iconography and archaeological finds. In general, most features of the later hoplite panoply of classical Greek antiquity, were already known to Mycenaean Greece.

==== Helmets ====
Among Mycenaean elites, the most common type of helmet was the boar's tusk helmet. Since each helmet required ivory from fifty to sixty tusks, their use signaled high status. These helmets were widely used throughout the Mycenaean period, and are depicted frequently in ancient Aegean art.

Helmets made entirely of bronze were also used and they became more and more common until the boar tusk helmets became heirlooms, while some of them had large cheek guards, probably stitched or riveted to the helmet, as well as an upper pierced knot to hold a crest. Small holes all around the cheek guards and the helmet's lower edge were used for the attachment of internal padding. Other types of bronze helmets were also used. Towards the end of the Mycenaean period, other types were adopted including horned helmets.

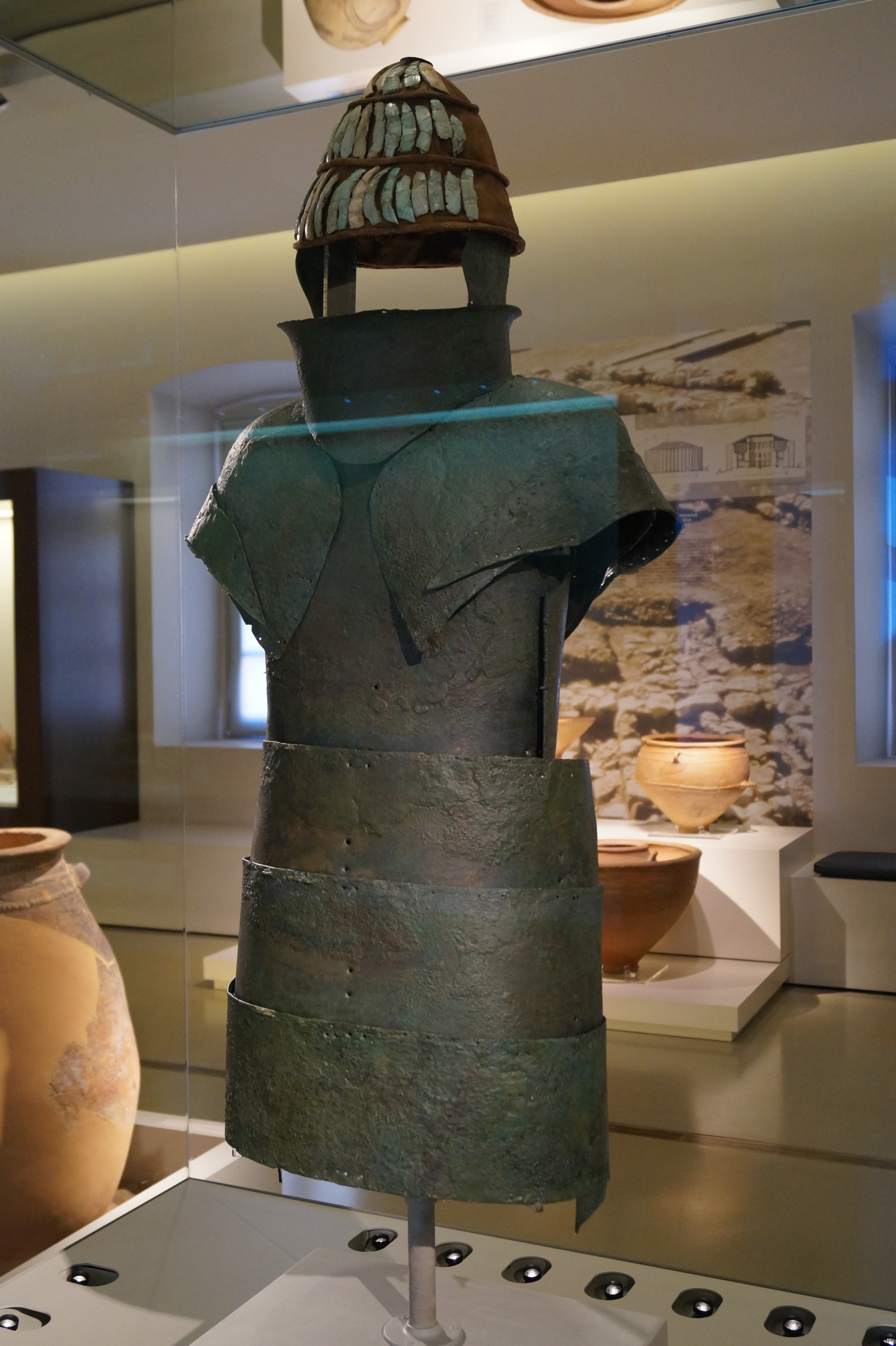
14th century BC Dendra panoply

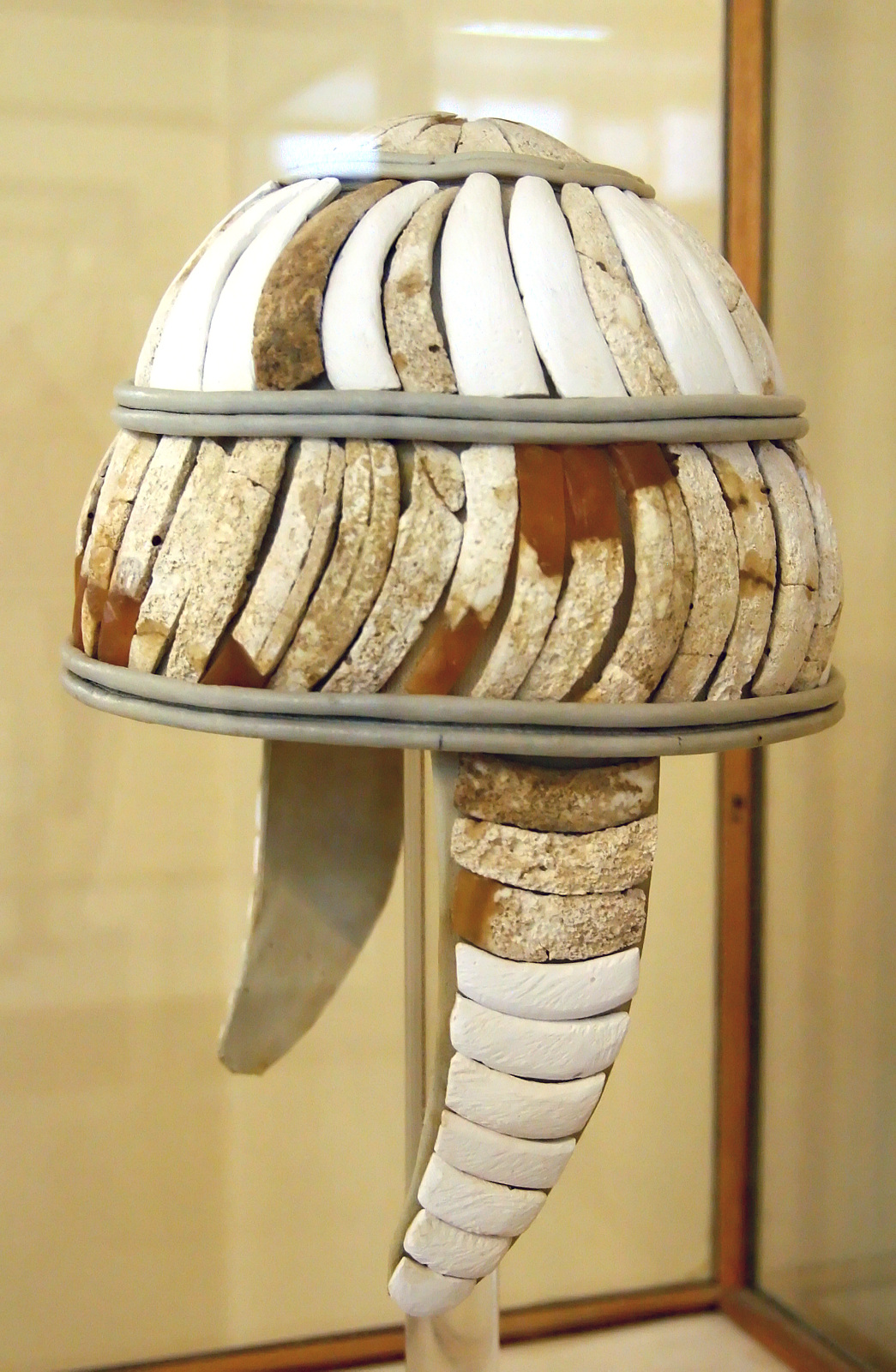
Boar's tusk helmets were typical of early Mycenaean warfare, but were later phased out by bronze helmets with boars tusk helmets becoming heirlooms.

== Chariots ==
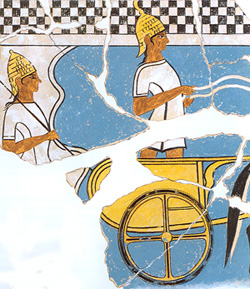
Chariot depiction in a fresco from Pylos, c. 1350 BC

The two-horse chariot appeared on the Greek mainland at least from the 16th century BC. Mycenaean chariots differed from their counterparts used by contemporary Middle Eastern powers. According to the preserved Linear B records, the palatial states of Knossos and Pylos were able to field several hundreds. The most common type of Mycenaean chariot was the "dual chariot", which appeared in the middle of the 15th century BC. In 14th century BC, a lighter version appeared, the "rail chariot", which featured an open cab and was most probably used as a battlefield transport rather than a fighting vehicle.

== Ships ==
Mycenaean ships were shallow-draught vessels and could be beached on sandy bays. There were vessels of various sizes containing different numbers of oarsmen. The largest ship probably had a crew of 42–46 oarsmen, with one steering oar, a captain, two attendants and a complement of warriors.

The most common type of Mycenaean vessel based on depictions of contemporary art was the oared galley with long and narrow hulls. The shape of the hull was constructed in a way to maximize the number of rowers. Thus, a higher speed could have been achieved regardless of wind conditions. Although it carried mast and sail, it was less efficient as a sailing ship. The Mycenaean galley offered certain advantages. Although lighter compared to the oared-sailing ship of the Minoans of Crete, it seated more rowers. Its steering mechanism was a triangular steering oar, a forerunner of the latter steering oar of Archaic era.

== Campaigns ==
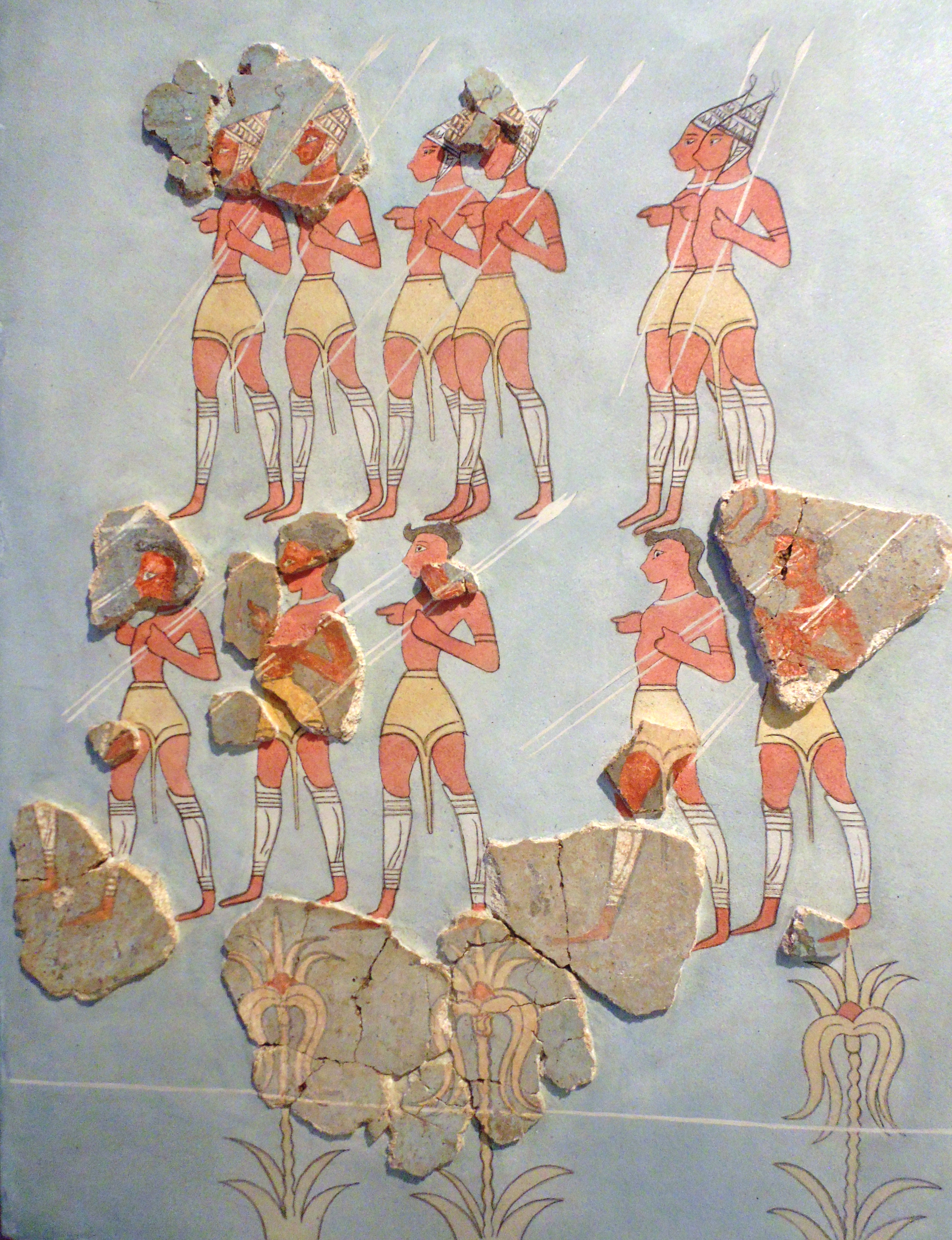
A Mycenaean fresco showing soldiers wearing boar tusk helmets, Archaeological Museum of Thebes.

Around 1450 BC, Greece was divided into a series of kingdoms on the Greek mainland, the most important centered at Mycenae, Tiryns, Pylos and Thebes. In the subsequent decades, the Mycenaeans began to expand throughout the Aegean, filling the niche previously filled by Neopalatial Minoan society. Thus, the Mycenaeans began to build up their maritime power in the Aegean Sea, expanding towards the Aegean Islands and Anatolian coast. During this period, the Mycenaeans established diplomatic ties with foreign states including Egypt, for whom Mycenaean soldiers were sometimes hired as mercenaries.

Hittite texts indicate the presence of Ahhiyawa, which began projecting power into Western Anatolia starting around 1400 BC. Ahhiyawa is generally accepted as a Hittite term for Mycenaean Greece, related to the term Achaeans used in Homeric Greek. During this period, the kings of Ahhiyawa were clearly able to deal with the Hittite kings both in a military and diplomatic way. Ahhiyawa activity was to interfere in Anatolian affairs by supporting anti-Hittite uprisings and through local vassal rulers. In one occasion, in c. 1400 BC, Attarsiya launched a campaign deploying an army headed by war chariots and attacked regions which were under Hittite influence. Later, Attarsiya, raided the island of Alashiya together with Anatolian allies including Madduwatta. The campaigns of Attarsiya represent the earliest recorded Mycenaean Greek military activity in Anatolia.

Around 1250 BC, mainland Greece was shaken by a wave of destructions whose cause is unknown. These incidents appear to have triggered a massive strengthening and expansion of fortifications in various sites. Nevertheless, none of these measures appear to have prevented the final destruction of the Mycenaean palace centers in the 12th century BC. The reasons that lead to the collapse of the Mycenaean culture have been hotly debated among scholars. The two most common theories are population movement and internal conflict.

== Legacy ==
Due to its portrayal in Homer's Iliad and Odyssey, this period of Greek history has often been perceived as an era of freewheeling warrior-heroes. In particular, the Mycenaeans have often been presented as especially warlike compared to the Minoans. While the Mycenaeans did have advanced military infrastructure, modern scholarship suggests that this characterization is not accurate overall.

== See also ==
- Ancient Greek warfare
- Bronze Age sword
