= Pygela =

Town in ancient Ionia

- Πύγελα or Φύγελα (Ancient Greek)
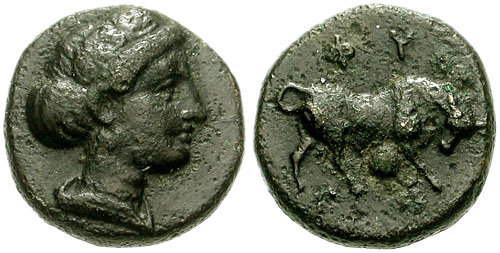
- Coins issued by Pygela ca. 350-300 BC

- 37°51′44″N 27°15′49″E
- Type: Different at different periods
- Region: Ionia
- Part of: Municipal unit of Melia; Municipal unit of Samos; Stand-alone polis Polis with sympoliteia (double citizenship) with Miletos; Municipal unit of Ephesos

Pygela (Ancient Greek: Πύγελα) or Phygela (Φύγελα) was a small town of ancient Ionia, on the coast of the Caystrian Bay, a little to the south of Ephesus. It is located near Kuşadası, Asiatic Turkey. The ruins are right down on Pygela Plaji, "Pygela Beach." They are obviously partly drowned.

According to Greek mythology, it was said to have been founded by Agamemnon, and to have been peopled with the remnants of his army; it contained a temple of Artemis Munychia. Dioscorides commends the wine of this town. It was a polis (city-state) and a member of the Delian League. Silver and bronze coins dated to the 4th century BCE bearing the legends «ΦΥΓΑΛΕΩΝ» or «ΦΥΓ» are attributed to the town.

== Etymology ==
The ancient authors provided it with a folk-etymology based on its obvious resemblance to Greek backside. It is said to have taken its name because some of the men of Agamemnon remained there after they had had a disease of the buttocks (πυγαί). Harpocration wrote that according to Theopompos it took its name when some of the men with Agamemnon stayed there on account of a disease to do with their buttocks (pygai, πυγαί). Suda wrote the same about the name of the place.

The folk-etymology is ridiculous, as it was always meant to be, in the tradition of naming subject places and peoples with derogatory exonyms. The settlement was never a part of the Ionian League, even though it was in Ionia. As it was part of the spoils of the Meliac War, chances are it was Carian. It does have a bronze-age history (see below) under the Hittite name of Piggaya, which, if too early for the Carian language, at least was Anatolian, probably Luwian, as the place then would have been in Arzawa.

Strabo wrote that Demetrius was speaking of the existence of Amazons near Pygela.

== History ==
In the "Indictment of Madduwatta", it is mentioned, under the Hittite name Piggaya, as being allied to the Ahhiyawa warlord Attarsiya, sometimes spelled Attarissiya. The "Indictment" is dated to the early-fourteenth century BC in the Reign of Arnuwanda I, and Attarsiya is popularly identified with Atreus, which would mean that the city predates a founding by Agamemnon and the traditional date of the Trojan war.
