= Marathesium =

Town of ancient Ionia

- Μαραθήσιον (toponym), Μαραθήσιος (city-ethnic) (Ancient Greek)
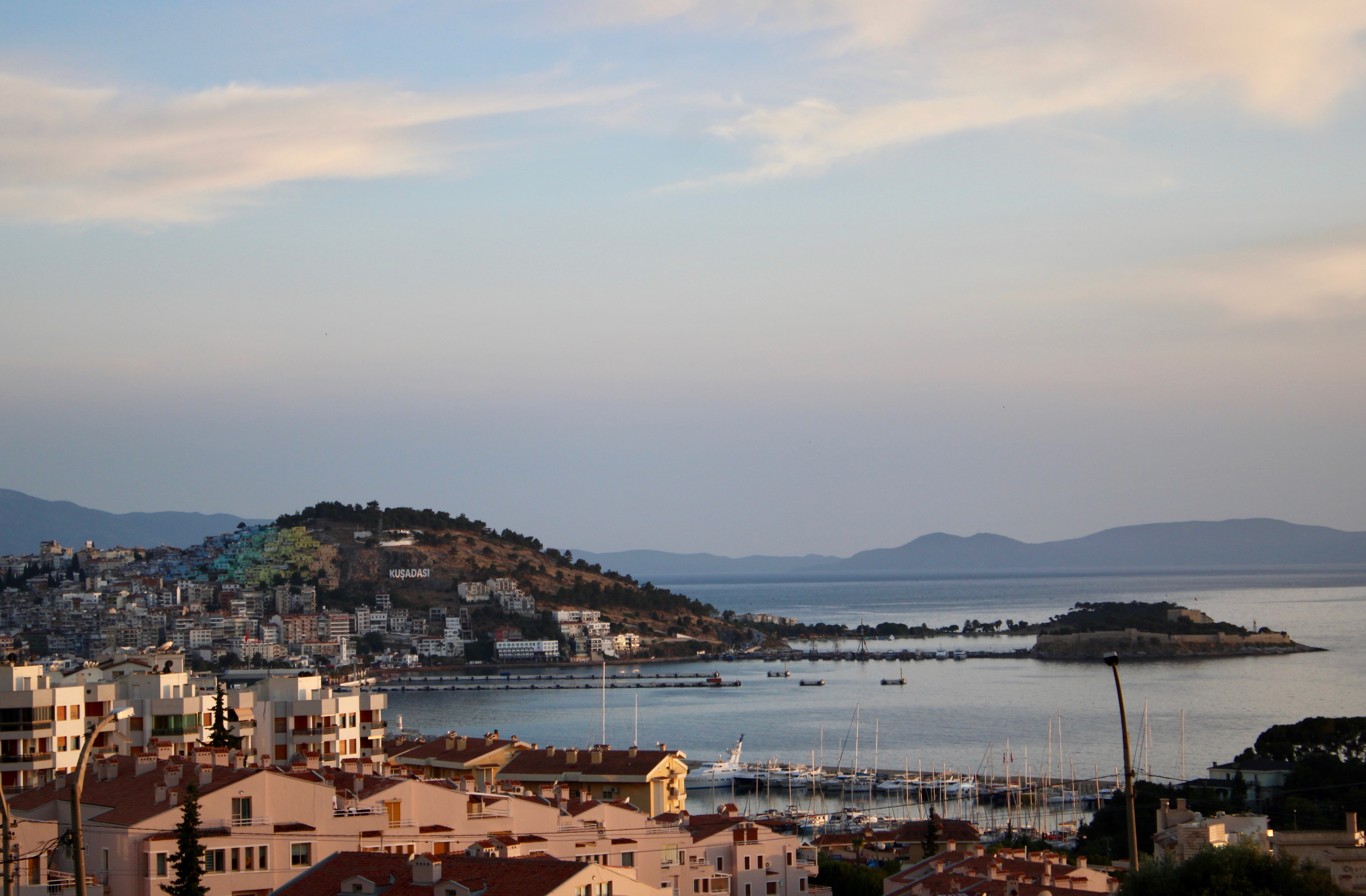
- The first hypothesis of the first modern investigator, J. Keil, is that Marathesion was southwest of Nuova Scala, but not as far as Ambar Tepe. He draws a map placing Marathesion at the port of Kuşadası and gives a picture of Kese Dağı with Pigeon Island. A modern photograph is given above. He places Ambar Tepe, not otherwise known in this region, on the south of the promontory and recuses himself from identifying it. A century later, H. Lohmann suggested that Ambar Tepe was Marathesium. This view is currently in favor with the encyclopedists. The coordinates given above are therefore those of Ambar Tepe.

- 37°49′45″N 27°15′16″E
- Type: Dependent polis
- Satellite of: Melia, then Samos, then Ephesos
- Location: Aydın Province, Turkey
- Part of: Ionia

Site notes
- Owner: Republic of Turkey

Marathesium or Marathesion (Ancient Greek: Μαραθήσιον) was a polis of ancient Ionia on the coast south of Ephesus, which was a member of the Ionian League. Marathesium was too small to be a member of the League or even to stand independently on its own. It has been classified recently as a dependent polis (Note: Hansen 2004, p. 19 Hansen points out that the Copenhagen Polis Group, an umbrella for a team making a 10-year study of poleis 1994-2004, found it necessary to innovate a category of polis, the dependent polis, which though self-governing, in extra-state matters was a dependency of some larger, more powerful polis. Sooner or later all the Ionian poleis fell under this category.) of one of the members of the League, first of Melia, then of Miletus after Melia had been defeated in the Meliac War, then of Samos, by lawsuit based on its occupation, and finally of Ephesus by a treaty involving the swap of cities.

Marathesium had something Ephesus did not, a harbor. The date of foundation of Ephesus is back in the bronze age under the Hittite state of Arzawa. During that time it came into contact with the Achaean Greeks. At some point after the fall of Arzawa it was invested by the Ionians. No doubt Ionian Ephesus was founded on the coast of the Aegean, like all the other Ionian cities. Since then the Küçük Menderes River, at the mouth of which it was placed, prograded to such an extent in parallel to the progradation of the Büyük Menderes River that Ephesus was left inland, like Priene and Myus on the other side of Mycale. Ionian ascendancy then passed to the Ionian cites still on the ocean: Miletus and Samos.

Ephesus needed a harbor. It found that by trekking across the alluvial plain to the southwest it had easy access to the one natural harbor on the long stretch of beach opposite Samos: the port today held by the Turkish city of Kuşadası, a strong candidate for the location of Marathesium. There was literally no other choice. Ephesus therefore fought to obtain the port, doing so finally by a swap with Samos.

That entire coast along with Mycale had been the territory of Melia. Melia was thus far too large to have been one of 13 equal cities of the Ionian League. It owned the land on which those cities were placed. They took it away from Melia during the Meliac War, dated about 700 BC, and divided the land among them. Melia was razed and never rebuilt. The best explanation is that Melia had owned the land because it was Carian, and its land was then part of Caria. There was often a close comradeship between Greeks and Carians, despite the fact that the Greeks often referred to them as barbarians.

The exact locality of Marathesion has not been determined for certain. The first investigator there concluded it was the port of Kuşadası. Its harbor was and is the best of the entire shore that extends from Mount Mycale to the River Cayster. It is situated under shelter of a headland consisting mainly of a large hill, or tepe, now the very center of Kuşadası. A statue of Mustafa Kemal graces the top. A large sign, Kuşadasi, like the Hollywood sign of Los Angeles, has been placed on the seaward side of the hill. An island, Pigeon Island, containing a fort, is connected to the hill by a causeway. Kuşadası means "Pigeon Island." This harbor is in the north angle of the promontory. If Marathesium was at the location of the port of Kuşadası, then it is probably under a closely-packed, much-valued city and as such may never be discovered.

There is, however, a second theory proposed by H. Lohmann after a study of the toponyms of north Ionia and the archaeological evidence of the 21st century. In the south angle of the same promontory on which Kuşadası is located, there is another harbor inland from which stood another hill, Ambar Tepe. It has been mainly destroyed by modern development. Lohmann's proposal is that Ambar Tepe was Marathesium. This theory leaves the problem of what to call the north harbor settlement.

== Localization ==
The literary sources are too few and too scant to give anything more than a general idea of the location of Marathesion, which is true of many ancient cities. More precise localization is typically the work of archaeology.

=== The Ephesus connection ===
Admiralty Chart No. 1546 of 1898. The coast of north Ionia can be read by expanding the top of the chart.

Pseudo-Skylax lists Marathesion as a place in Lydia. The language is equivocal: "... Ephesos and port, Marathesion ...." Either Marathesion is in apposition to port, meaning it is the port of Ephesos, or Marathesion is in series, meaning Ephesos has some unknown port, but Marathesion is not part of it. Stephanos of Byzantium mentioning Marathesion says in a second sentence "It is a city of the Ephesians." Both points of view are represented in the works of modern scholars.

Ephesus was originally placed on the lower slopes of a 300 m (980 ft) NE-SW mountain, Bülbüldağ, on the south coast of the estuary of the Cayster River, then deep water. It was able to maintain its position as a deep-water port until about 750 BC. At that time the island of Syrie (Korudağ), located before the mouth of the Cayster, was still free of silt. (Note: Figure 2 is a map showing the shorelines at various times as isochrons. Note that aggradation proceeds down the river at first and then also from Ephesus outward. The roadways of Ephesus extend to the NW to try and reach an ever-receding shoreline, while the canal sponsored by Nero attempts to bypass the river, which was not very navigable by that time. At last the population deserted Ephesos in favor of New Ephesos.)

By 300 BC Syrie was a hummock in the alluvial plain. Marshes had begun to build northward from Ephesos. By 200 BC it was no longer an oceanic port. The population could still reach the estuary via long streets to the NW. From that time matters went from bad to worse. The Ephesians fought to save their now river-port. They dredged the region frequently. Nero had a canal built around the now non-navigable river. By 200 AD all vestiges of the port were gone.

Ephesus had only two paths of approach: the estuary, and overland from the coast of north Ionia, the latter coming through what is now Kuşadası. A major issue in localization of the area is that the then toponym of Port Kuşadası is not known. It was the target of population transfer from Ephesus. As the capability of Ephesus to transfer people and goods with maximum efficiency decreased, the land approach became increasingly important. Ephesus went on through the later Roman Empire and Byzantine period as an important international city of the Christian faith.

Inevitably in the 13th century the Greek name Nea Ephesos, "New Ephesus," begins to be used. The Venetians ruled the city then. They were making stand against the inroads of the Turks, which turned out to be the last stand. They called the port Latin Scala Nova, Italian Scala Nuova, "Newport." The coupling of the two suggest that the newness of Nea and Nova/Nuova means that Ephesus had a new port, rather than that it was inherited from any past toponym.

=== Scribal error in Strabo ===
These toponyms of the 13th century introduced a confusion in subsequent scholarship, as Strabo had already apparently used the term Neapolis. In his description of the coast of north Ionia he reports a geographic order of toponyms, south to north: Samos, Neapolis, Marathesium, Ephesus (Strabo 14.1.20). The Samians had once owned Marathesium, he said, but then exchanged it to Ephesus for Neapolis, which was closer to Samos. This Neapolis in the more recent centuries of travel writing seemed at first to be Scala Nuova, as is marked "Ancient Neapolis" on Admiralty Chart 1546.

Ancient Neapolis cannot be Scala Nuova, as it is south of Marathesium, and not immediately before Ephesus. There is no other mention of this Neapolis anywhere. Ulrich von Wilamowitz-Moellendorff had suggested in 1906 that Neapolis was a scribal error in Strabo's text. Instead of being interpreted as eita Neapolis, "and next Neapolis," the phrase should have been eit' Anea Polis, "and next Anea city." Neapolis disappears altogether and Anea stands in its place, a known city south of Ambar Tepe on what was then the coast, now inland. Both Keil and Lohmann accepted this view. Lohmann proposed Ambar Tepe as the location of Marathesium. However, that choice leaves downtown Kuşadası without a toponym, if Scala Nuova can be assumed to be a settlement of the population of Ephesus.

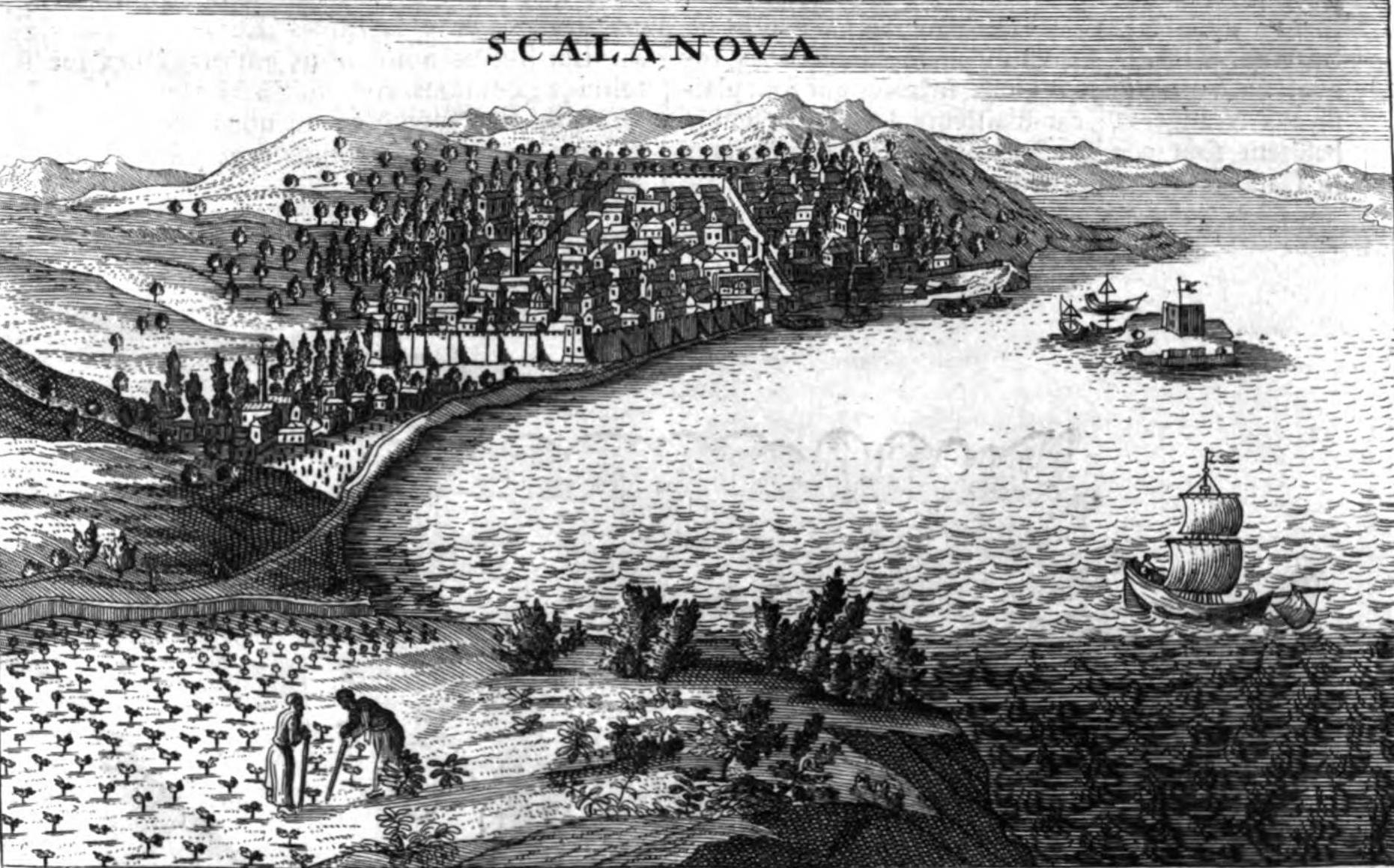
Pitton de Tournefort's Scalanova not long prior to 1717.

The question is not a new one. In 1717 the botanist, Joseph Pitton de Tournefort, published a three-volume account of an expedition he had made in the orient. In this account he visits Scalanova from Ephesus. His woodcut of the place shows the unmistakable outline of Kese Dağı and Pigeon Island without the causeway. Presumably Scalanova is the walled community bordering on the harbor and rising to the col behind it. The hill itself is outside the wall, as is described by Keil.

Pitton de Tournefort calls the hill "Cape Scalanova, which projects greatly into the sea." He is at a loss to explain the etymology of the name, calling it an "Italian name that the Franks gave to it perhaps after the destruction of Ephesus." By Franks one must understand any European. Apparently the Venetians, who had their own Italic language must be Franks, or else Pitton de Tournefort was unaware of the Venetian hegemony. He suggests that Scalanova is a transcription of "the ancient name of Neapolis of the Milesians," but does not elucidate with any literary references. He identifies Scalanova with Turkish Cousada.

== Sources ==
=== The Carian issue ===
Stephanus of Byzantium calls Marathesium a town of Caria. What he might mean by that is not very clear. He says the same thing about most of the Ionian cities, even though the border of classical Caria is Mount Mycale. Marathesium was not within it. Before the Meliac War it was part of the vast holdings of Melia on Mount Mycale, which Stephanos also calls Carian. Melia was the 13th member of the Ionian League. In contrast to the other cities of the League, Melia owned the land on which many of the others were situated, suggesting that Melia had been Carian, but loaned its services to the League.

Whether Stephanos means that Melia and Marathesium actually spoke Carian is not stated. Carian was a daughter language of Luwian, the language of the Anatolian Languages group spoken by Arzawa, a rebellious province of the Hittite Empire, which fell at the end of the Bronze Age. Arzawa did not just disappear. It split into different territories that came to evolve different Anatolian daughter languages. Even in the Bronze Age the Greeks were settling in the coastal cities of Arzawa, notably Ephesos and Miletus. It should be no surprise therefore if the coast north of Miletos had actually been in the Carian-speaking territory, or if Carian had already been given up in those cities in favor of Greek. Certainty awaits further evidence.

The name, Marathesion, looks suspiciously Greek. It is one of a group of Greek toponyms apparently derived from the Greek word Marathos or Marathon after the "fennel" growing on site, Foeniculum vulgare. The fact that the name of this herb occurs in Linear B as ma-ra-tu-wo only strengthens the possibility that the toponyms were devised and assigned in the Bronze Age.

It is also mentioned in the Periplus of Pseudo-Scylax and by Pliny the Elder.

=== Disposition after the Meliac War ===
The town belonged to the Samians; but at some time they made an exchange, and, giving it to the Ephesians, receiving in return the Neapolis.

=== Membership in the Delian League ===
It was a member of the Delian League since it appears in tribute records of Athens between the years 443/2 and 415/4 BCE.

== Reference bibliography ==
- Hansen, M.H. (2004). "Introduction". In Hansen, M.H.; Nielsen, T.H. (eds.). An Inventory of Archaic and Classical Poleis (PDF). Oxford: Oxford University Press.
- Keil, J. (1908). "Zur Topographie der ionischen Küste südlich von Ephesos". Jahreshefte des Österreichischen Archäologischen Institutes in Wien (in German). 11.
- Lohmann, Hans (2007). Forschungen und Ausgrabungen in der Mykale 2001–2006 (Report) (in German). ResearchGate.
- Rubinstein, Lene (2004). "Ionia". In Hanson, Mogens Herman; Nielson, Thomas Heine (eds.). An Inventory of Archaic and Classical Poleis. Oxford: Oxford University Press. pp. 1053–1107.
