= Attarsiya =

Military leader of Ahhiya

The Eastern Mediterranean and Middle East during the time of Attarsiya

Attarsiya (Note: Alternative transliterations include Attar(a)s(h)iya(s), Attar(a)s(h)ija(s).) (fl. c. 1400 BC) was an Ahhiyan (Achaean) warlord. He is known from a single Hittite text, which recounts his military activities in Western Anatolia and Alashiya. These texts are significant because they provide the earliest textual evidence of Mycenaean Greek involvement in Western Anatolian affairs. Scholars have noted potential connections between his name and that of Atreus from Greek mythology.

== Military episodes ==
The Indictment of Madduwatta describes two incidents involving Attarsiya which occurred in Western Anatolia. In the first incident, Attarsiya attacked an unnamed land and forced the local warlord Madduwatta to flee. Madduwatta found refuge with the Hittite king Tudhaliya I/II who installed him as vassal ruler of Zippasla and the Siyanta River Land, territories which seem to have been located somewhere near the Arzawa Lands.

In the second incident, Attarsiya again attacked Madduwatta, this time with an army that allegedly included 100 war chariots and 1,000 infantry. Attarsiya was initially victorious, though Madduwatta's Hittite backers dispatched an army under Kisnapli. The Indictment of Madduwatta gives a brief description of the battle:

Kisnapli went into battle against Attarsiya 100 [chariots and ... infantry] of Attarsiya [drew up for battle]. And they fought. One officer of Attarsiya was killed, and one officer of ours, Zidanza, was killed. Then Attarsiya turned [away(?)] from Madduwatta, and he went off to his own land.

This description has been interpreted as suggesting a duel between the two sides' champions, though it is also possible that only these two casualties were considered worthy of mention. After the battle, Attarsiya returned home and Madduwatta was reinstalled as ruler.

Later on, Attarsiya raided the island of Alashiya together with Anatolian allies including his former enemy Madduwatta. This attack alarmed the Hittites, who claimed Alashiya as a tributary but lacked the naval resources to directly control it.

== Textual background ==
Attarsiya is known solely from the Indictment of Madduwatta (CTH 147), a fragmentary Hittite text written around 1380 BC. This document, written on behalf of the Hittite king Arnuwanda I, recounts the Hittites' troubled relationship with a restive vassal named Madduwatta. Attarsiya plays a role in several episodes described in the text. He was allied with the Ionian small town of Pygela, known with the Hittite name of Piggaya. When the Indictment of Madduwatta was first translated, it was assigned an erroneous date at the end of the 13th century BC. However, subsequent scholarship showed that it was in fact two centuries older based on archaic characteristics of the texts. (Note: The text was written in the voice of Arnuwanda, referring to his father as Tudhaliya. Initial scholars identified these with Arnuwanda III and his father Tudhaliya IV rather than Arnuwanda I and his father Tudhaliya I/II.)

== Political context ==
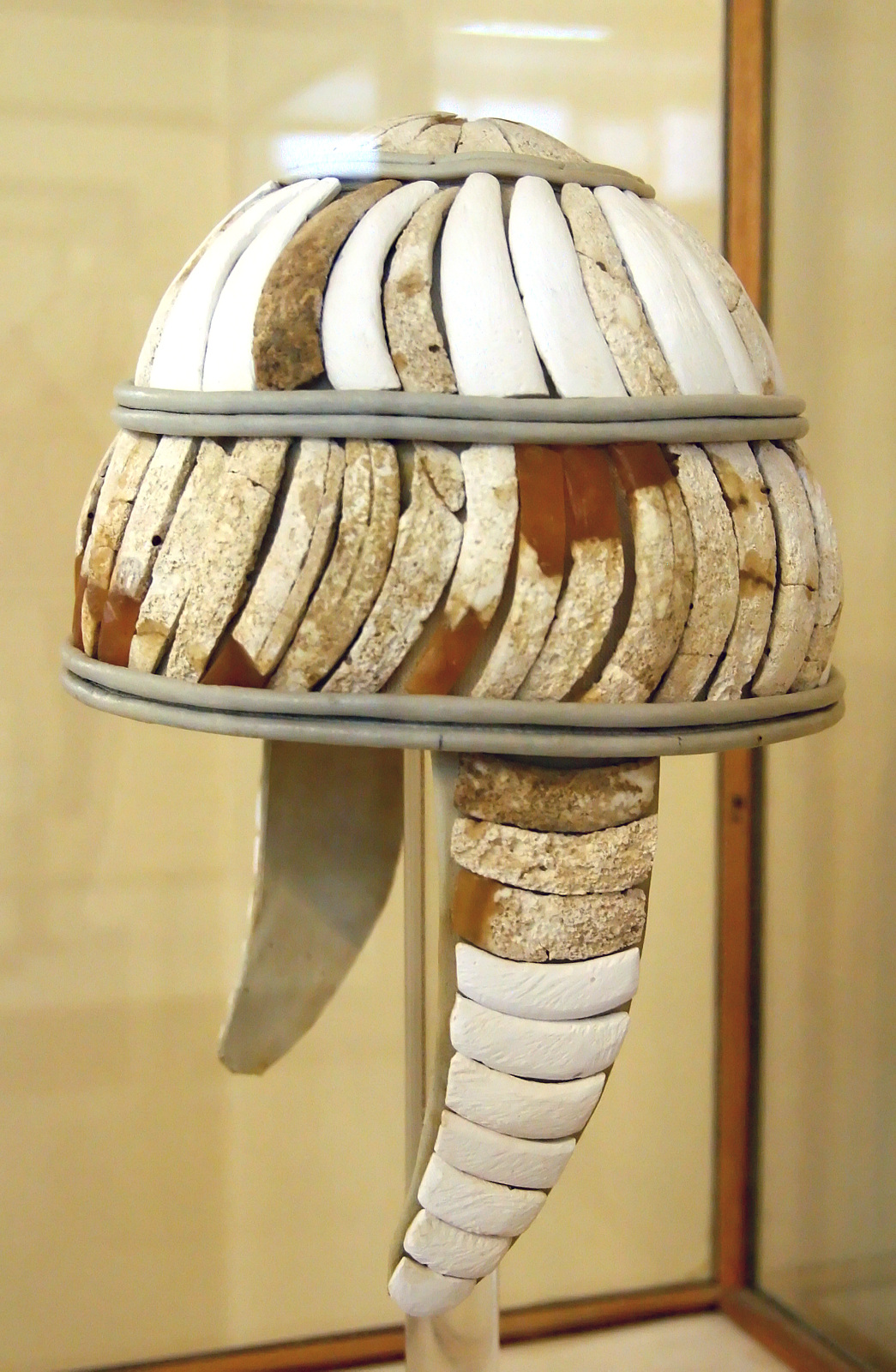
Boar's tusk helmets were the Mycenean elite's headgear of choice. A depiction of a soldier wearing such a helmet was found in the Hittite capital, Hattusa.

The Hittite account of Attarsiya's exploits provide the earliest textual evidence of Mycenaean involvement in Anatolia. These incidents are contemporary with archaeological evidence of growing Mycenaean presence at Miletus, which may have served as Attarsiya's base, as it did for later Mycenaean warlords. The Hittites' growing awareness of the Mycenaeans is attested by roughly contemporary finds from Hattusa including a Mycenaean-style sword seized from a participant in the Assuwa Revolt and a pot sherd decorated with an image that appears to depict a soldier wearing a boar's tusk helmet. In the decades after Attarsiya, Mycenaean involvement increased, to the point that the Hittite king Hattusili III even addressed the Ahhiyawan king as a peer. However, the Mycenaeans were driven out of Anatolia around 1220 BC, during the reign of Tudhaliya IV.

Attarsiya's exploits are also significant for what they reveal about the political structure of the Mycenaean world. While Linear B records suggest a number of independent Mycenaean palace-states, one potential reading of the Indictment implies that Attarsiya's army consisted of 100 chariots and 1000 infantry. Since these numbers are greater than any single Mycenaean palace-state could have mustered, some researchers such as Jorrit Kelder have argued that Ahhiyawa was an emerging Kingdom that included several palace-states, whereas others suggested a somewhat looser constellation of palaces, such as an alliance or confederation.

== Link with mythical Atreus ==
It has been suggested by several scholars that the term Attarsiya might be related to the Greek name "Atreus", borne by a mythical king of Mycenae. However, scholars have cautioned that even if there is a connection, that does not entail that Attarsiya himself was the basis of the mythical Atreus.

Martin West proposed that Atreus is a secondary form based on the patronymic Atreïdēs, which is in turn derived from the Mycenaean *Atrehiās. This could then be derived from a preform *Atresias, *Atersias or *Atarsias, more readily connectable with Attarsiya. According to an alternative view proposed by Hittitologist Albrecht Goetze, Attarsiya could be a possessive adjective, meaning "belonging to Atreus", analogous to the typical Homeric way of referring to Agamemnon and Menelaus, throughout the Iliad.

A further possible link to the grecophone sphere is the Linear B term ta-ra-si-ja, well attested in Pylian tablet series JN, a word which means "copper/bronze allotment" or "weight unit of copper/bronze", or something similar, applied to metalworkers. On the Pylos JN 415 tablet there is also found a noun a-ta-ra-si-jo, meaning "those without copper/bronze". The context in which ta-ra-si-ja occurs during the Late Helladic period suggests that those who produced or worked with the allocated raw materials were a large work force and the work was of a low-paid status. Worth noting is the independence of a-ta-ra-si-jo smiths from allotments accorded ta-ra-si-ja smiths. The opposites occur often together. Pylian tablet JN 389 summarizes the amount of metal distributed to a ta-ra-si-ja. Eleven smiths are named to receive an allotment and are then referred to collectively as a group, given an extra issue, as e-pi-da-to, that has been linked to Greek δατέομαι from the root δαίω (daíō, "to divide, share") – that is, epi- 'after' + dastoi, in Mycenean Greek. It is followed a few lines down on the tablet by a-ta-ra-si-jo, and again named persons. That there evidently were smiths, many, without an allocation within the system of rationing implies, barring a shortage, that they had other occupations, access to sufficient quantities of copper or bronze to be self-reliant, or, indeed, that the role belonged to a smith recruitment process rather, which is why it was thought necessary to list.

Supposing Attarsiya to have been an a-ta-ra-si-jo, serving as an active (or inactive) smith was not among the activities ascribed to him in the Hittite Indictment of Madduwatta. A Greek amassing a fortune overseas in the bronze business and remembered as Atreus, on the other hand, is conceivable.
