= Argos panoply =

Ancient Greek suit of armour

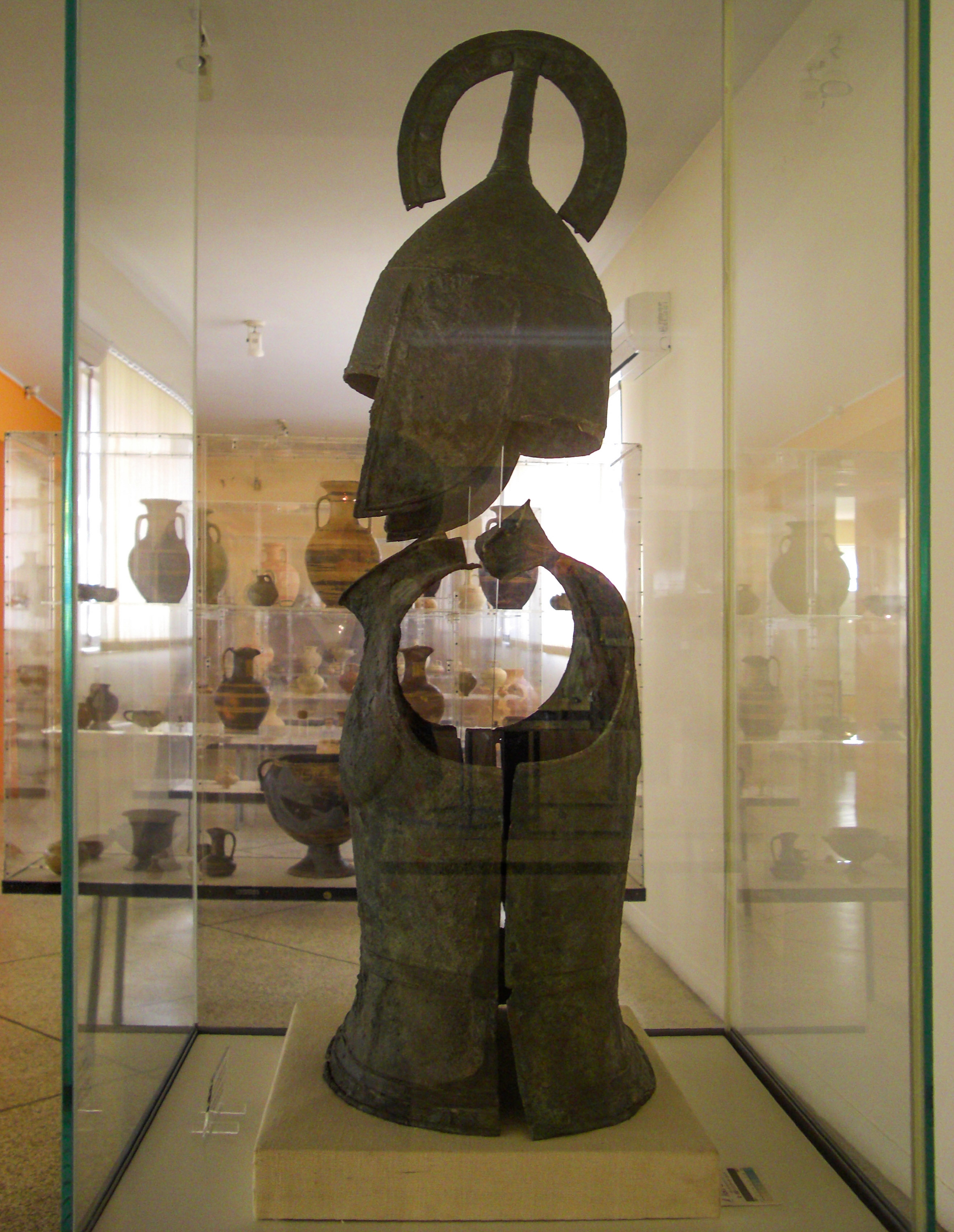
Argos panoply on display in the archaeological museum of the town.

The Argos panoply is an ancient Greek suit of armour, discovered in 1953 in Argos, Greece, presently on display at the Archaeological Museum of Argos in Greece.

== Background ==
In 1953, at Argos, a team of French excavators led by archaeologist Paul Courbin discovered in a tomb a panoply of bronze armour, consisting of a cuirass and helmet, probably dating to the last quarter of the eighth century BCE. As such, it was notably earlier than the closest examples of archaic armour previously found, the majority of which came from deposits at Olympia. The discovery led to reinterpretations of the time of the first introduction of metal body armour into Greece.

One of the more striking features of this panoply was the decoration of the cuirass, directly comparable – identical, almost – to the decoration seen on the earliest of the later Olympia examples, dating to the next century. Courbin, in his publication of the 1953 Argos excavations, also noted similarities in the marking of the thoracic arch in the breastplate of the newly unearthed Argos cuirass and in the statues of Kleobis and Biton at Delphi.

== See also ==
- Dendra panoply
