= Kisnapili =

Kisnapali (fl. c. 1400 BC) was a Hittite general during the reign of Tudhaliya I in the early 14th century BC. The Hittite text known as the Indictment of Madduwatta reports that he supported the Hittite vassal Madduwatta against the Ahhiyan warlord Attarsiya, but was later betrayed by Madduwatta and died in battle near Dalawa.
