= Neapolis (Ionia) =

Neapolis (Ancient Greek: Νεάπολις), was a town on the coast of ancient Ionia, south of Ephesus, on the road between Anaea and Marathesium. It was a small place which at first belonged to the Ephesians, and afterwards to the Samians, who received it in exchange for Marathesium. Scholarship in the 19th century identified its site with the place then called Scala Nova, at a distance of about three hours' walk from the site of ancient Ephesus; but William Martin Leake believed that this place marks the site of the ancient Marathesium, and that the ancient remains found about halfway between Scala Nova and Tshangli or Changli (modern Güzelçamlı), belong to the ancient town of Neapolis, and Charles Fellows identified Neapolis with Tshangli or Changli itself.

Modern scholars treat its site as unlocated.
