= Dendra panoply =

15th century BC Mycenaean panoply

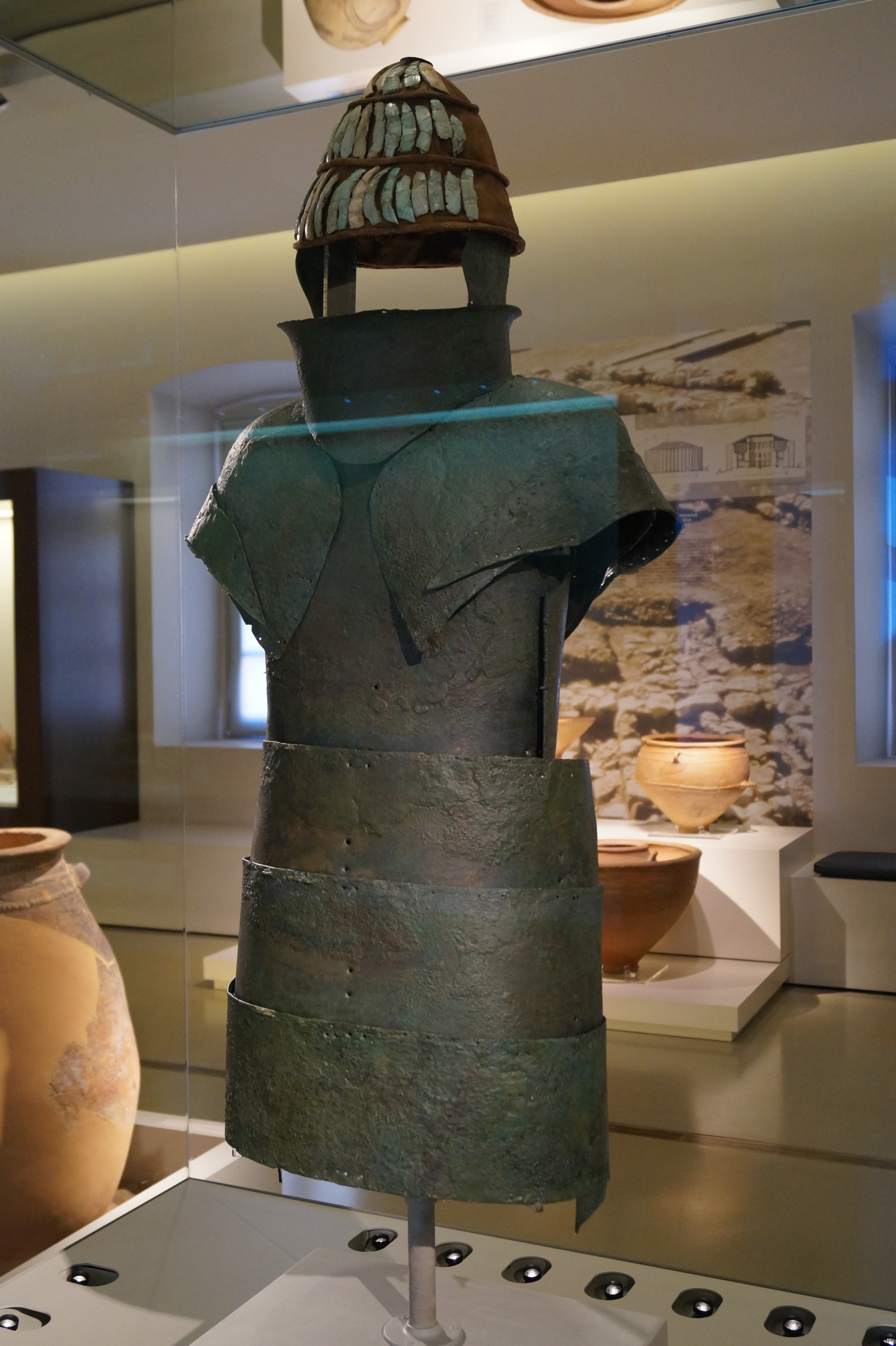
- Material: Bronze
- Created: c. 1450 BC
- Discovered: May 1960; Dendra, Argolis, Greece
- Present location: Archaeological Museum of Nafplion, Greece

The Dendra panoply or Dendra armour is a Mycenaean-era panoply (full-body armor) made of bronze plates uncovered in the village of Dendra in the Argolid, Greece. It is currently on display at the Archaeological Museum of Nafplion.

== Description ==
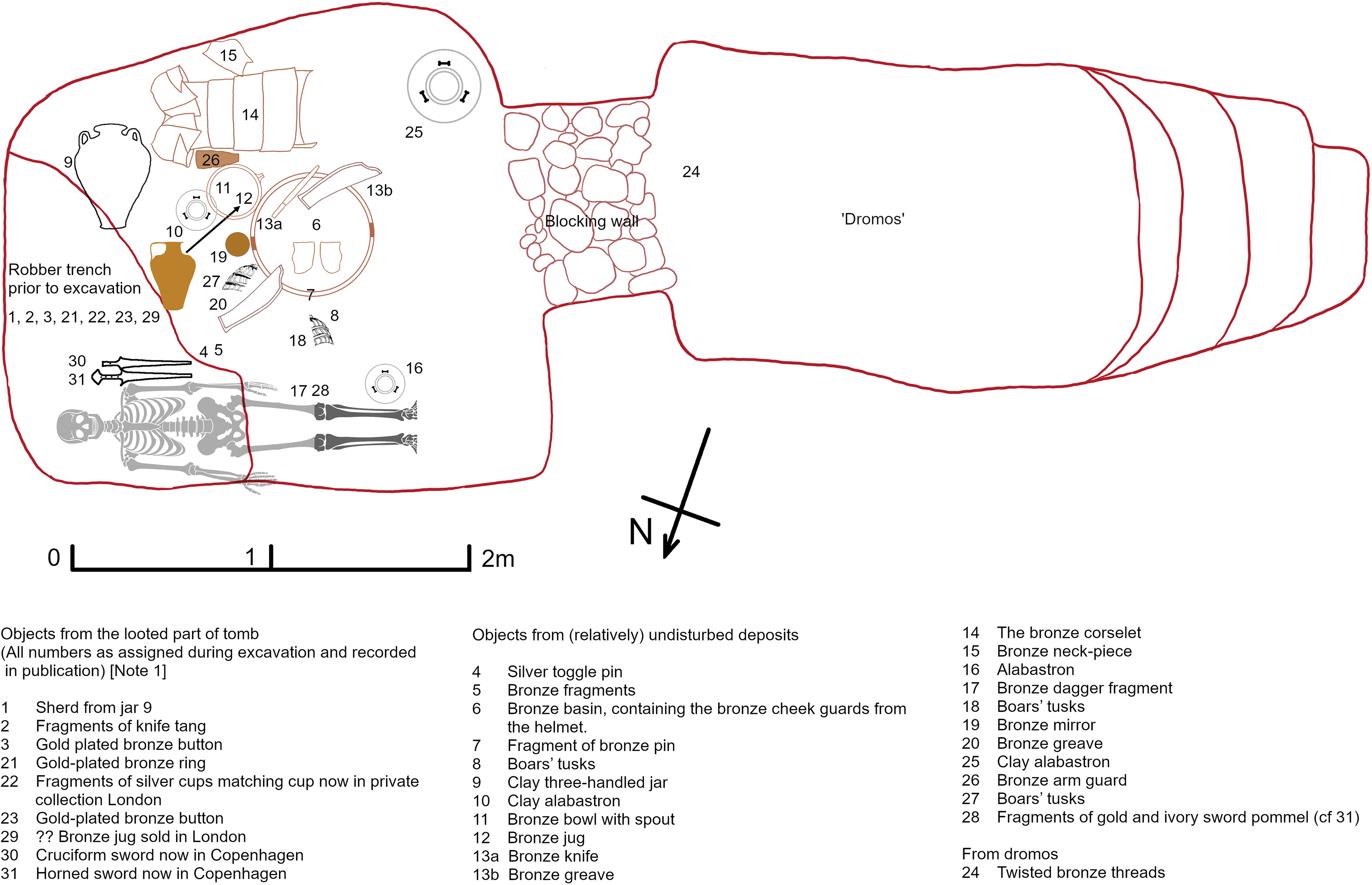
Diagram of the "Cuirass" Tomb in which the Dendra armour was found, illustrating the location of the offerings based on information provided during the original excavation

Several elements of body armor (body cuirass, shoulder guards, breast plates, and lower protection plates) from the late Mycenaean period have been found at Thebes; some bronze bands have been also found at Mycenae and Phaistos. Bronze scales were found at Mycenae and Troy. In May 1960, Swedish archaeologists discovered the earliest example of a beaten bronze cuirass at Dendra, dated at the end of the 15th century BC. (Note: Isolated bronze shoulder pieces and apron plates are known from Dendra, Thebes, and Phaistos in Crete: they "extend the chronological range of the Dendra type back to 1450 and forward to 1350", according to King 1970.) It forms part of the Late Helladic (LHIIIa) Dendra Panoply, which consists of 15 separate pieces of bronze sheet, held together with leather thongs, that encased the wearer from neck to knees. The panoply includes both greaves and lower arm-guards. The arm-guard is unique but greaves, probably made of linen, are often depicted in late Mycenaean art. The few bronze examples that have been found only covered the shins and may have been worn over linen ones, as much for show of status Diane Fortenberry has suggested, as for protection. Although we have only this one complete panoply to date, armor of similar type appears as an ideogram on Linear B tablets from Knossos (Sc series), Pylos (Sh series), and Tiryns (Si series).

The panoply's cuirass consists of two pieces, for the chest and back. These are joined on the left side by a hinge. There is a bronze loop on the right side of the front plate and a similar loop on each shoulder. Large shoulder guards fit over the cuirass. Two triangular plates are attached to the shoulder guards and gave protection to the wearer's armpits when his arms were in the raised position. There is also a deep neck guard. The Linear B ideogram depicting armour of this type makes the neck guard clearly discernible, and protection by a high bronze collar was a typical feature of Near Eastern body armour. Three pairs of curved plates hang from the waist to protect the groin and the thighs. All these pieces are made of beaten bronze sheet and are backed with leather and loosely fastened by ox-hide thongs to allow some degree of movement. The complete panoply thus forms a cumbersome tubular suit of armour, which fully protects the neck and torso, and extends down to the knees. It appears that lower arm guards and a set of greaves further protected the warrior, all made of bronze, as fragments of these were also found in the grave at Dendra. Slivers of boars' tusks were also discovered, which once made up a boars'-tusk helmet.

The figures on the Warrior Vase (Mycenae, c. 1200 BC, National Archaeological Museum, Athens) are wearing body armor. However, this armor is different. It may be either an embossed waist-length leather corslet with a fringed leather apron that reaches to mid-thigh and possible shoulder guards, very much like that worn by the Peoples of the Sea depicted on the mortuary temple of Ramesses III at Medinet Habu, Lower Egypt, or, alternatively, the body armour may be a 'bell' corselet of beaten bronze sheet, a type also found in central Europe at that time.

== Research ==
The panoply has been the subject of extensive academic study and experimental research. While many scholars have discussed its functionality, significant experimental investigations have also been conducted. In 1988, Diana Wardle, using a replica crafted by students at the Bournville College of Art, Birmingham (now part of Birmingham City University), made initial findings regarding its practical use. In 2012, professor Barry Molloy, utilizing a different replica, contributed important insights into the kinematics of the armor. In 2018, archaeologist Spyros Bakas, through a meticulous reconstruction of the panoply, provided crucial information on its distinctive features and the anatomy of its components, while also addressing the operational capabilities of the warrior. Most recently, in 2024, researchers from the University of Thessaly, led by professor Andreas Flouris, using Wardle's 1980s replica, added new conclusions on the ergonomics and kinematics of the warrior wearing the armor, showing that "[a] group of special armed-forces personnel wearing a replica of the Dendra armour were able to complete an 11-hour simulated Late Bronze Age combat protocol that we developed from a series of studies based on the available evidence". This research indicates that the armour was perfectly suited to use in battle, not simply ceremonial as originally assumed.

== See also ==
- Argos panoply

== Sources ==
- Paul Åstrom, The Cuirass Tomb and Other Finds at Dendra Part I: The Chamber Tombs (Studies in Mediterranean Archaeology, iv) (Göteborg) 1977. The official publication.
- Nicolas Grguric, The Mycenaeans: c 1650–1100 BC, "the Dendra armour" (Osprey)
- Anthony Snodgrass, Early Greek Armour and Weapons: From the End of the Bronze Age to 600 B.C. (Edinburgh/Chicago) 1964: 71–73, 76f.
