= Boar's tusk helmet =

17th to 10th century BC Greek helmets

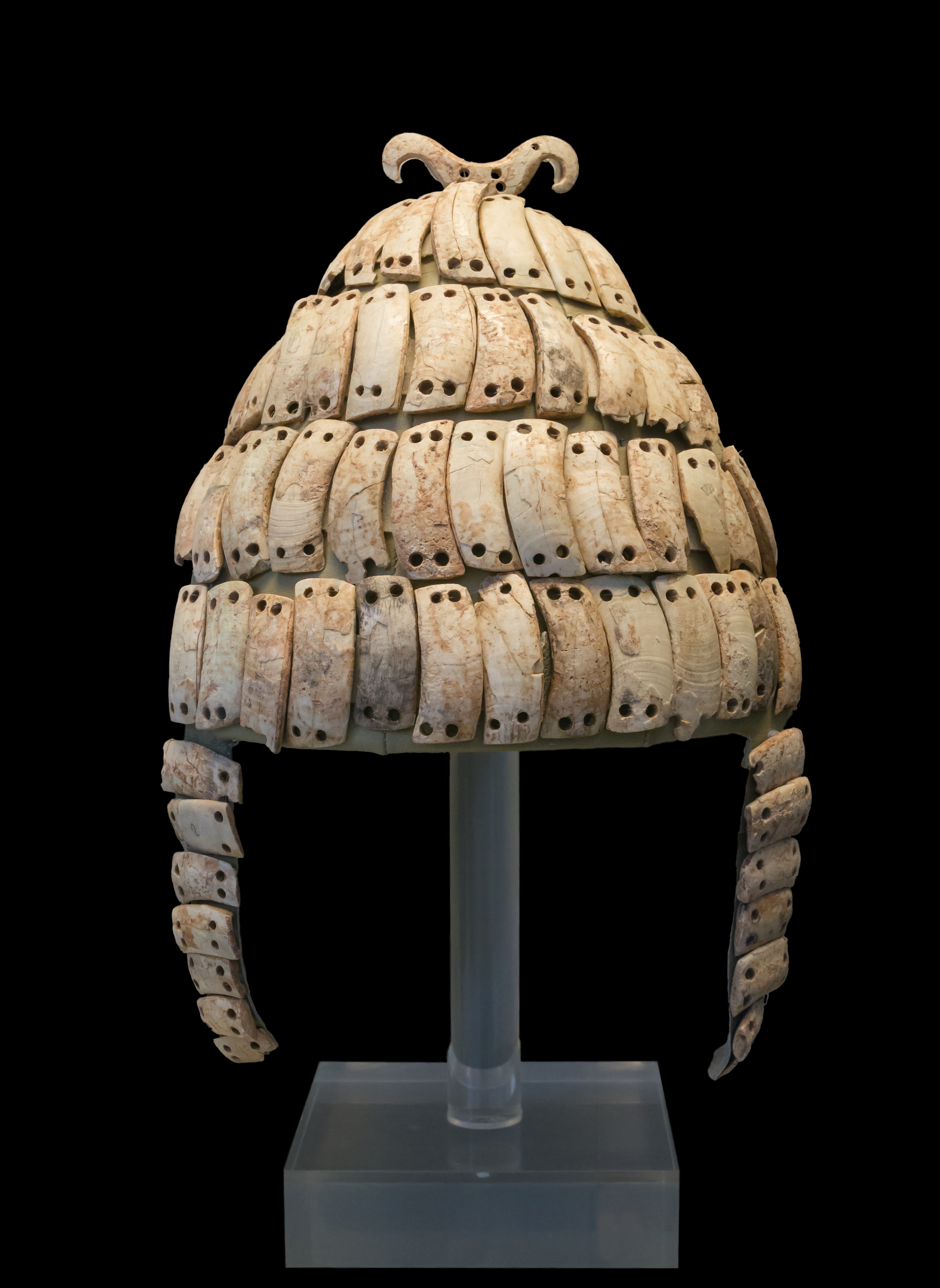
Mycenaean Greek boar tusk helmet from Mycenae, 14th century BC. On display at the National Archaeological Museum, Athens

Helmets using ivory from boars' tusks were known in the Mycenaean world from the 18th or 17th century BC (Shaft Graves, Mycenae) to the 10th century BC (Elateia, Central Greece). The helmet was made through the use of slivers of boar tusks which were attached to a leather base, padded with felt, in rows. A description of a boar's tusk helmet appears in book ten of Homer's Iliad, as Odysseus is armed for a night raid to be conducted against the Trojans.

Meriones gave Odysseus a bow, a quiver and a sword, and put a cleverly made leather helmet on his head. On the inside there was a strong lining on interwoven straps, onto which a felt cap had been sewn in. The outside was cleverly adorned all around with rows of white tusks from a shiny-toothed boar, the tusks running in alternate directions in each row.

Μηριόνης δ' Ὀδυσῆϊ δίδου βιὸν ἠδὲ φαρέτρην
καὶ ξίφος, ἀμφὶ δέ οἱ κυνέην κεφαλῆφιν ἔθηκε
ῥινοῦ ποιητήν: πολέσιν δ' ἔντοσθεν ἱμᾶσιν
ἐντέτατο στερεῶς: ἔκτοσθε δὲ λευκοὶ ὀδόντες
ἀργιόδοντος ὑὸς θαμέες ἔχον ἔνθα καὶ ἔνθα

εὖ καὶ ἐπισταμένως: μέσσῃ δ' ἐνὶ πῖλος ἀρήρει.

— Homer, Iliad 10.260–5

Fragments of ivory which might have come from helmets of this kind have been discovered on Mycenaean sites (at Dendra, for instance, fragments were found alongside the bronze panoply excavated in 1960) and an ivory plaque, also from a Mycenaean site, represents a helmet of this kind. Although they would not provide protection as good as that of a metal helmet, they may have been worn by some leaders as a status symbol, or a means of identification.

Homer specifies that the helmet given by Meriones to Odysseus was an heirloom, passed down through the generations, a detail which perhaps suggests its value. Although the number of plates required to make an entire helmet varies – anything from 40 to 140 can be required – it has been estimated that forty to fifty boars would have to be killed to make just one helmet.

== Appearance ==
Boar tusk helmets exhibit considerable variety in the arrangement of the tusk plates and in helmet crests. Two main forms are distinguished: an early form with loosely arranged horizontal plates, and a later form with densely packed vertical plates.

The early form is characterised by a loose arrangement of plates in varying groupings. Typically, the plates are attached horizontally to form rows, with the plates shortening from bottom to top, giving each row the shape of an isosceles trapezoid. Examples of the early form have been found in Aegina, Eleusis, Argos and Thebes.

In the later form, described by Homer and known from depictions, the plates are arranged vertically without gaps, forming distinctive rows. There are usually two to five such rows, with the naturally curved plates in adjacent rows generally alternating in orientation. The plates measure 5–8 cm in length, and the number of rows depends on this size. Important finds of this type have been made, for example, in Sparta, near Athens, at the Late Minoan cemetery of Armenoi on Crete, in Mycenae, Kallithea and Knossos.

The conical shape helped to deflect projectiles. Many helmets featured cheek guards, which usually also had boar tusk plates. From around 1450 BC onwards, later helmets commonly included a neck guard, consisting either of leather straps alone or reinforced with additional boar tusk plates. A chin strap was present to stabilise the helmet.

Helmets displayed various decorations. The earliest depictions, from Thera (Santorini) and dating to around 1500 BC, show a crest. Other images depict different types of horns or wreaths.

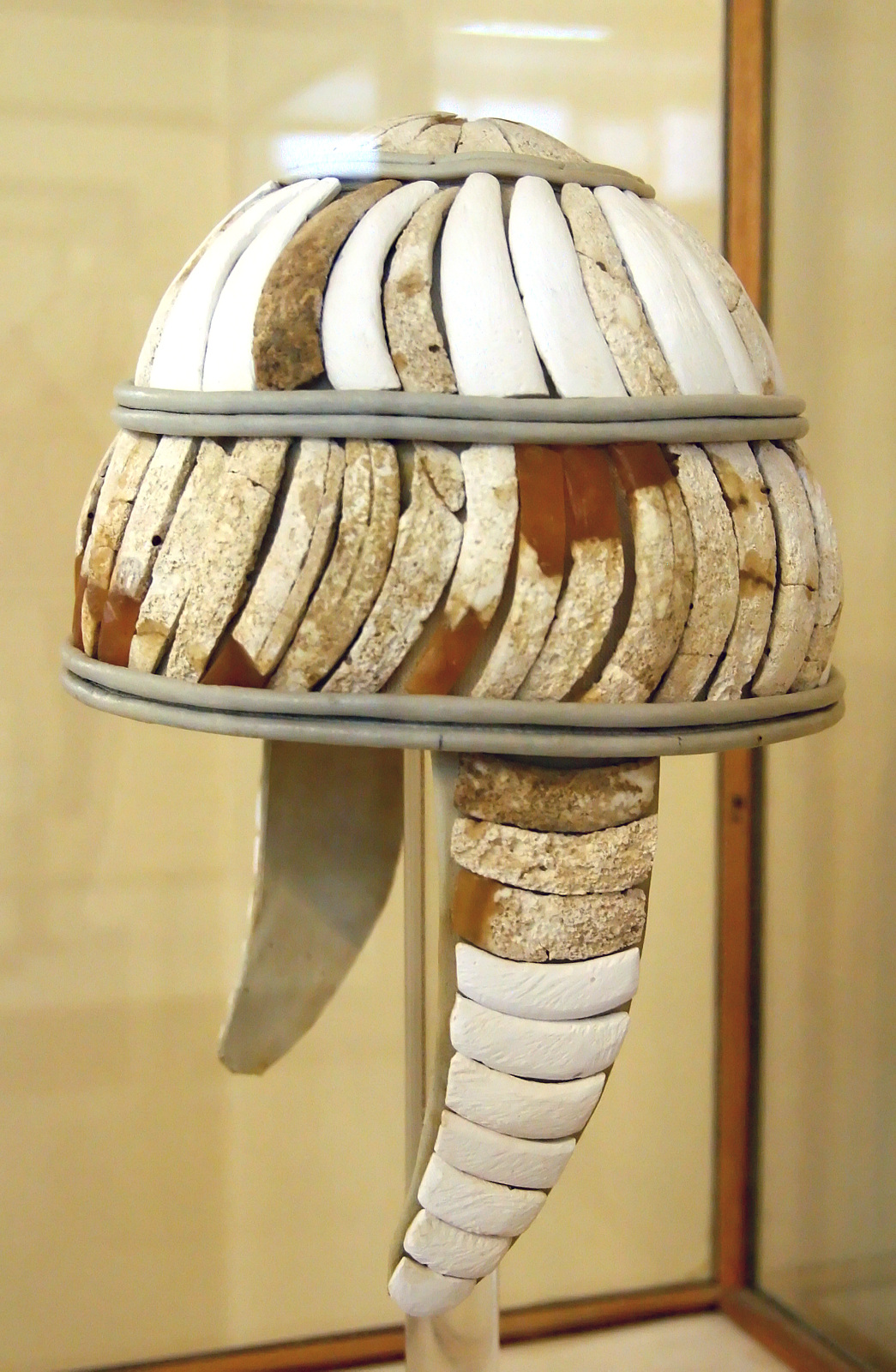
Boar tusk helmet, Heraklion Archaeological Museum

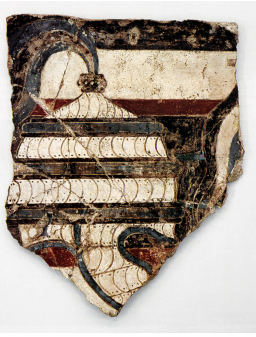
Fresco fragment from Akrotiri on Santorini (c. 1600 BC)

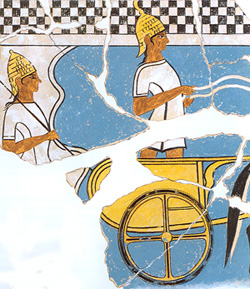
Fresco fragment from Pylos (c. 1350 BC)

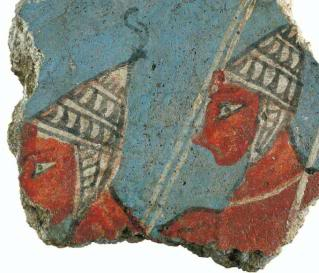
Fresco fragment from Orchomenus (13th century BC)

== Construction and manufacture ==
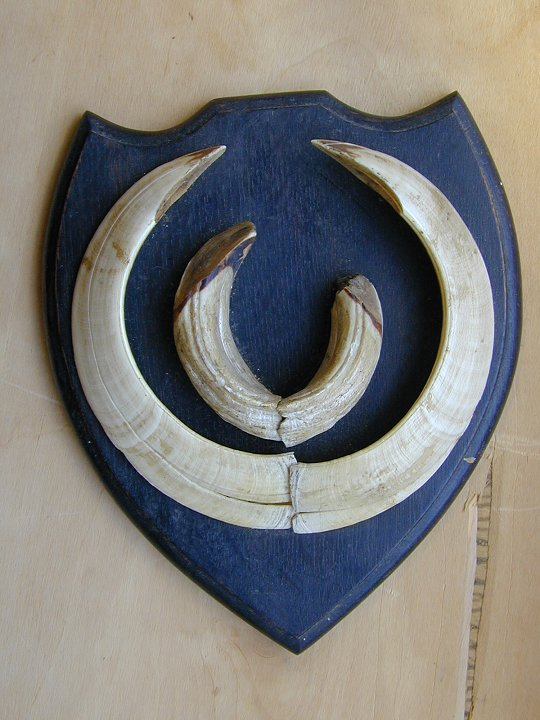
Lower (long) and upper (short) tusks of a boar

The boar tusk plates were made from the two lower tusks of the boar, which average 20 centimetres (7.9 inches) in length. The upper tusks are significantly smaller and, due to their greater curvature, lack the required shape. After drying, which made the material more brittle, the tusks could be split lengthwise. Depending on size and shape, up to four plates could be produced from a single tusk. An average complete helmet required the tusks from 40 to 50 boars, while particularly elaborate examples needed more than 140.

Several types of perforations were used to attach the plates to the underlying structure:

- Piercing from front to back;
- Holes drilled from the side and from the back, meeting at right angles;
- Drilling from one side to the other.

The holes were placed either at the corners or in the centre of the long sides. The plates were secured to the base with thread passed through these holes. In the front-to-back piercing variant, the stitching remained exposed and thus vulnerable to damage. The more elaborate drilling methods were likely developed to protect the seams.

No archaeological evidence survives for the material of the underlying structure and the plates themselves are often poorly preserved. Homer's description provides the main additional clues. Various reconstruction attempts exist for both early and late forms.

The early form has been reconstructed as a cap made from six leather segments sewn together. The boar tusk plates are arranged loosely across the seams, protecting them.

The late form was reconstructed by Peter Connolly. The main body consisted of a cylindrical band of leather, the upper part of which was cut into strips. These leather strips were woven upwards and tied together, giving the helmet its conical shape and improving its ability to deflect downward blows. The interior was lined with felt, providing comfort, additional protection and tension for the upper strip layer. The boar tusks attached to the leather offered further armouring. With front-to-back piercing, the securing thread was poorly protected. Connolly covered it with leather strips, closely matching depictions that show narrow bands between the rows of plates. Concealing the plate edges not only protected the stitching but also prevented an enemy's blade from getting caught in the tusks.

== Origin and distribution ==
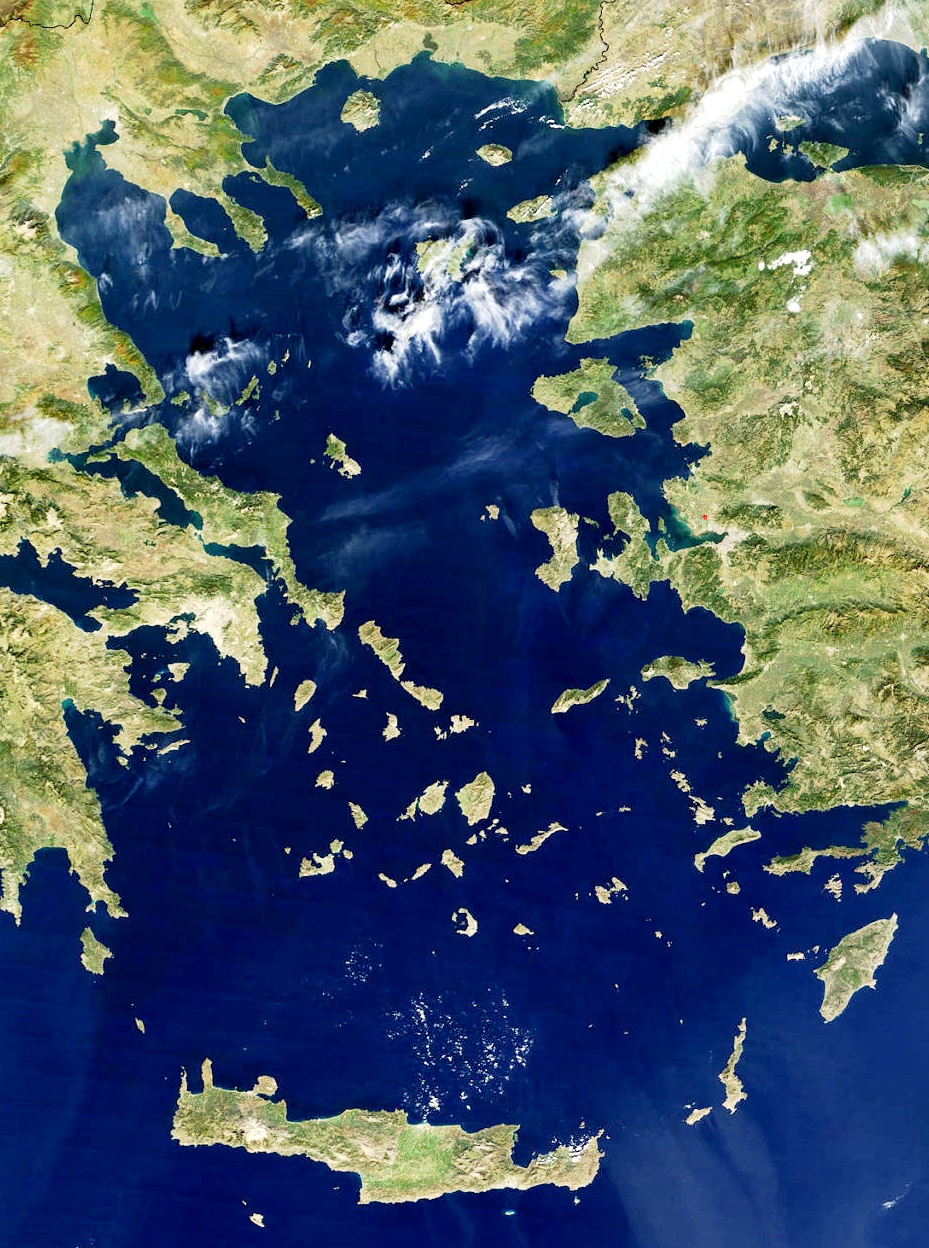
Satellite image of the Aegean Sea

The helmet originated in the Aegean region during the Middle Helladic period. Estimates for its emergence range from the 18th to the mid-16th century BC.

In this form, the helmet represents an independent Greek development. However, a possible connection exists with finds from the Mariupol grave field on the Black Sea (modern Ukraine), where tusks dated to around 2000 BC were discovered, possibly used as helmet reinforcement or decoration.

The boar tusk helmet was used on the Greek mainland, the surrounding islands and Crete, as evidenced by more than 50 finds, primarily from graves. Isolated tusk plates do not necessarily indicate a boar tusk helmet, as they could also have been attached, for example, to arm guards. Finds are less common on Crete, possibly because no wild boar population existed there, or due to differences in Minoan burial practices.

Warriors wearing boar tusk helmets on a fresco from Akrotiri (c. 1600 BC)

Detail from the fresco above

It remains unresolved whether the helmet was first used on the Greek mainland or on Crete. Both Minoans and Mycenaeans are known to have employed this type.

The earliest finds come from Kolonna on the island of Aegina, dated variously to around 1800 BC or 1600 BC. The island lies close to the mainland but had contacts with Minoan culture at the time. The Minoans established Europe's earliest civilization on Crete and influenced surrounding regions, including the mainland. On the island of Thera (modern Santorini), under former Minoan influence, frescoes depicting boar tusk helmets were found at Akrotiri. Their dating to 1600 BC is not definitive, as theories about the timing of the Minoan eruption differ by about 100 years. A labrys (Cretan-Minoan double axe) dated 1700–1450 BC and bearing an image of a boar tusk helmet also attests early use on Crete. Around 1430 BC, the Mycenaeans conquered Crete, and the two cultures gradually merged.

Finds also occur outside the Mycenaean cultural sphere. In Enkomi on Cyprus and on Sardinia, ivory figurines depicting warrior heads wearing boar tusk helmets have been discovered. These are probably Aegean imports, though local production is possible on Cyprus. A papyrus from Amarna in Egypt, dated to around 1450 BC, shows Mycenaean intruders or mercenaries equipped with boar tusk helmets. A pottery shard from Hattusa, capital of the Hittite empire (modern Turkey), depicts Mycenaean warriors with helmets shown in zigzag lines, which are interpreted as boar tusk plates. The image, from the late 15th to 14th century BC, may represent a confrontation between the cultures. Fragments of a boar tusk helmet were found at Beycesultan (near modern Çivril), also within the Hittite sphere of influence.

The end of the Mycenaean palatial period, around 1180 BC, saw widespread political and cultural upheavals, followed by the "Greek Dark Ages". These changes affected military equipment, and the boar tusk helmet disappeared. The latest known remains, from Kallithea, date to around 1150 BC.

== Significance ==
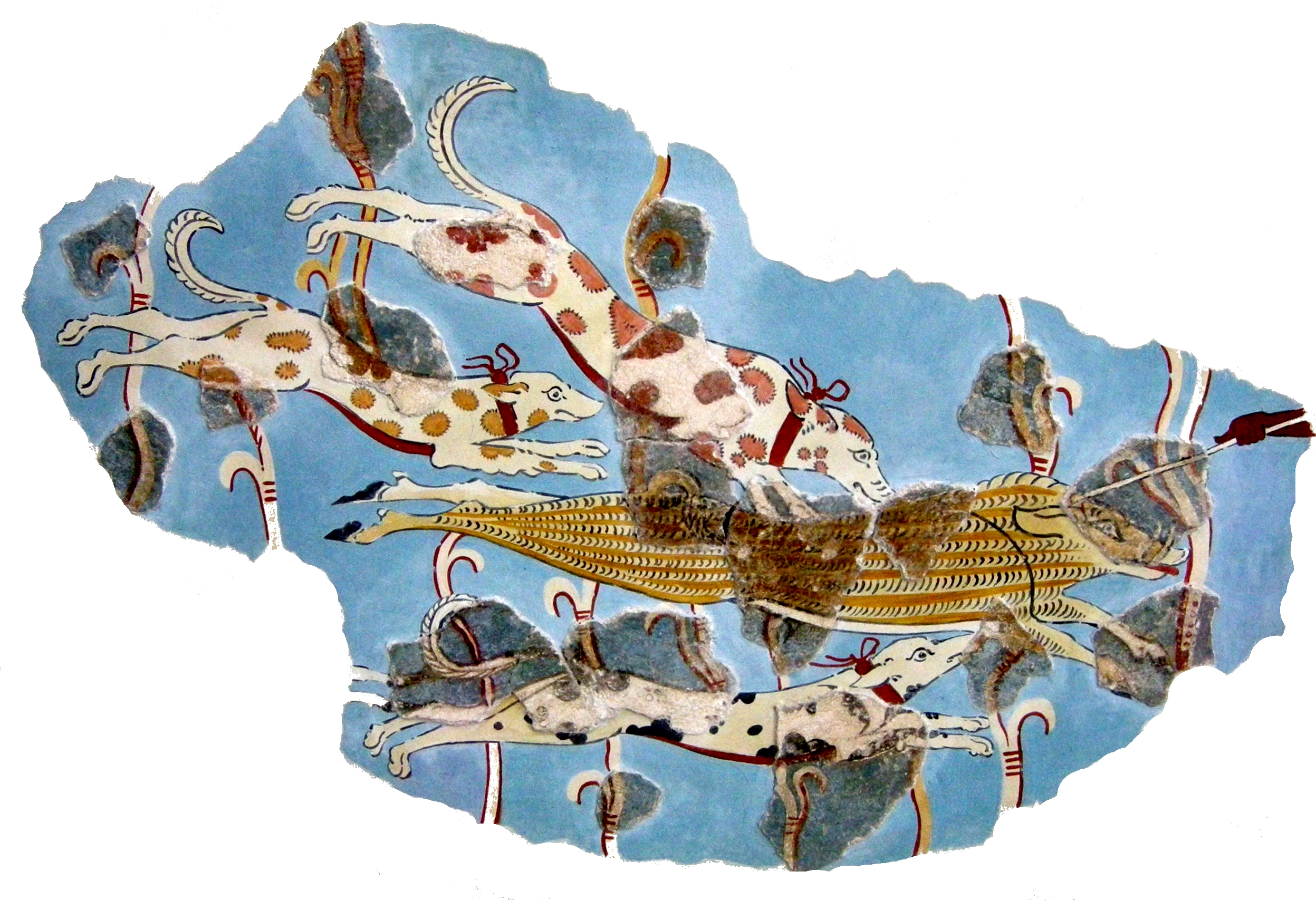
Boar hunt; fresco from Tiryns

Although bronze was available in the Aegean Bronze Age, boar tusks were used for armour. This is attributed to technical difficulties and the cultural importance of tusks. Swords and spearheads were already cast in bronze, but producing large-area bronze sheets suitable for helmet bells was challenging with the brittle alloys then available; the metal needed to be strong enough for protection yet light enough not to overburden the wearer.

Boar hunting appears to have held an important place in Mycenaean warrior culture. The tusks on helmets served as hunting trophies, demonstrating the wearer's courage and skill. Hunting boar was regarded as the supreme test of hunting prowess, achievable only by the most capable and bravest. Mythical boar hunts, such as those of the Erymanthian boar or the Calydonian boar, remained embedded in cultural memory into historical times. Over time, what began as mere display of trophies developed into a functional helmet, with the tusks providing effective protection due to their extremely hard material.

The boar tusk helmet was expensive and indicated high social status. It was likely passed down as a family heirloom, increasing in value through association with famous owners. Homer describes one such helmet passing through several hands: originally belonging to Amyntor, it was stolen by Autolycus (Odysseus's grandfather), then passed via Amphidamas, Molus and Meriones to Odysseus. That the boar tusk helmet remained familiar in Homeric times, centuries after production had ceased, suggests such helmets were preserved as heirlooms long beyond their manufacture.

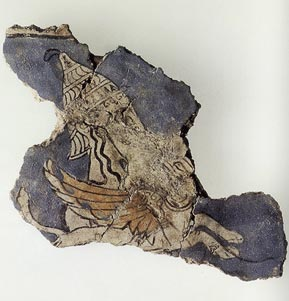
War goddess wearing a boar tusk helmet

Some boar tusk helmets were placed in warriors' graves as valuable grave goods. Their high status is also suggested by a Mycenaean fresco depicting one on the head of a war goddess.

Even after bronze became viable for helmets, boar tusks continued in use. Depictions and finds from Mycenae indicate helmets combining tusk plates with bronze discs. The famous Dendra panoply (c. 1424 BC) includes a boar tusk helmet with bronze cheek guards. Tusks were sometimes imitated in glass attached to helmets or by engraving bronze helmets to represent the curves and rows of tusk plates. Bronze helmets appear from around 1400 BC; the earliest was found at Knossos. At that time, however, bronze helmets remained rare, and boar tusk helmets continued in use.

Despite the relatively numerous depictions and finds compared with other helmet types, not every Greek warrior is likely to have been equipped with a boar tusk helmet, as the required number of animals could scarcely have been hunted. Simpler helmets of felt and leather may have existed, featuring the row design of boar tusk helmets (hence called "zoned helmets") but lacking further reinforcement. No archaeological evidence survives for these, and the few possible depictions are ambiguous, potentially being simplified representations of helmets with tusk or bronze plates.

Apart from fragments of a linothorax, boar tusk helmets are the only archaeological evidence of defensive armour from the early Minoan and Mycenaean periods.

== See also ==
- Military of Mycenaean Greece
- Germanic boar helmet
