= Warrior Vase =

Ancient Greek vase found on the acropolis of Mycenae

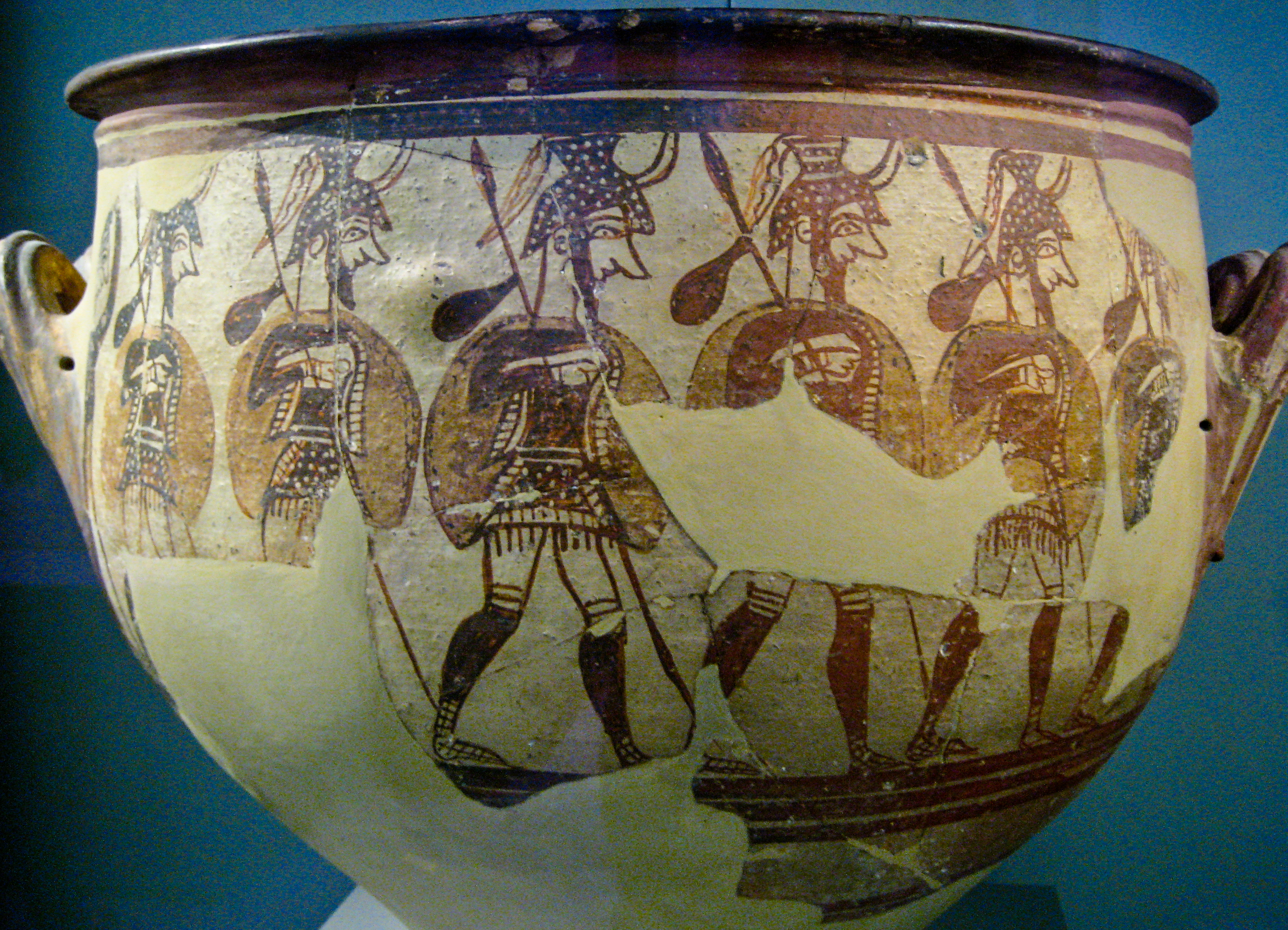
The Warrior Vase

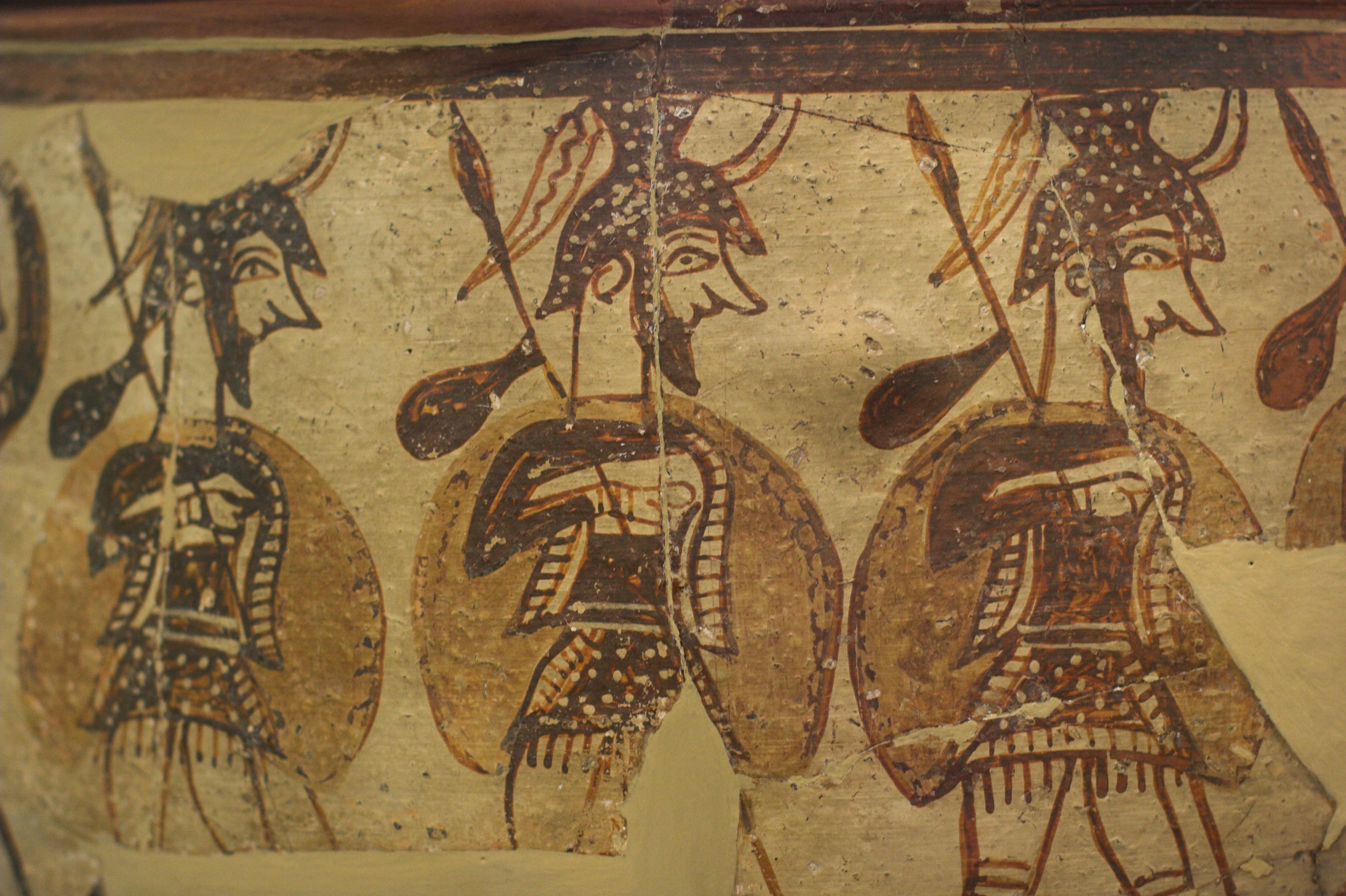
Detail of the soldiers

The Mycenaean Warrior Vase, found by Heinrich Schliemann on the acropolis of Mycenae, is one of the prominent treasures of the National Archaeological Museum, Athens. The Warrior Vase is probably the best-known piece of Late Helladic pottery, though its dating, to the 13th or 12th century BC, has been the subject of much discussion. It is a krater, a mixing bowl used for the dilution of wine with water, a custom which the ancient Greeks believed to be a sign of civilized behavior.

The broad frieze of armed soldiers on the vase, which is incomplete, suggested the name that Schliemann gave it. The warriors are clad in short chitons, breastplates, helmets and greaves; they are armed with spears and carry shields. The bull's head handles for long encouraged scholars to date the piece later, in the early seventh century BC.

Many scholars observe that the style of the figures and the bull head handles of this thirteenth century BC vase are very similar to eighth century BC pottery. Similar spearmen are also depicted in eighth century BC pottery, which introduces a curious 500-year gap in styles. This vase also leads to clues about post-palatial Mycenaean warriors. The knapsacks the warriors carry suggest that they may have to travel long distances to battle. Figures on one side of the vase wear helmets with horns. The other side depicts warriors in "hedgehog" style helmets. The latter is equipped with spears that are shorter than general spears depicted of the time. The warriors on both sides have shields, tunics, and leg protection. The warriors on either side appear to be uniform suggesting the army as a whole and not representing individual warriors.
