= Melia (Ionia) =

Town of ancient Ionia

- Μελία, Μελίη (Ancient Greek)
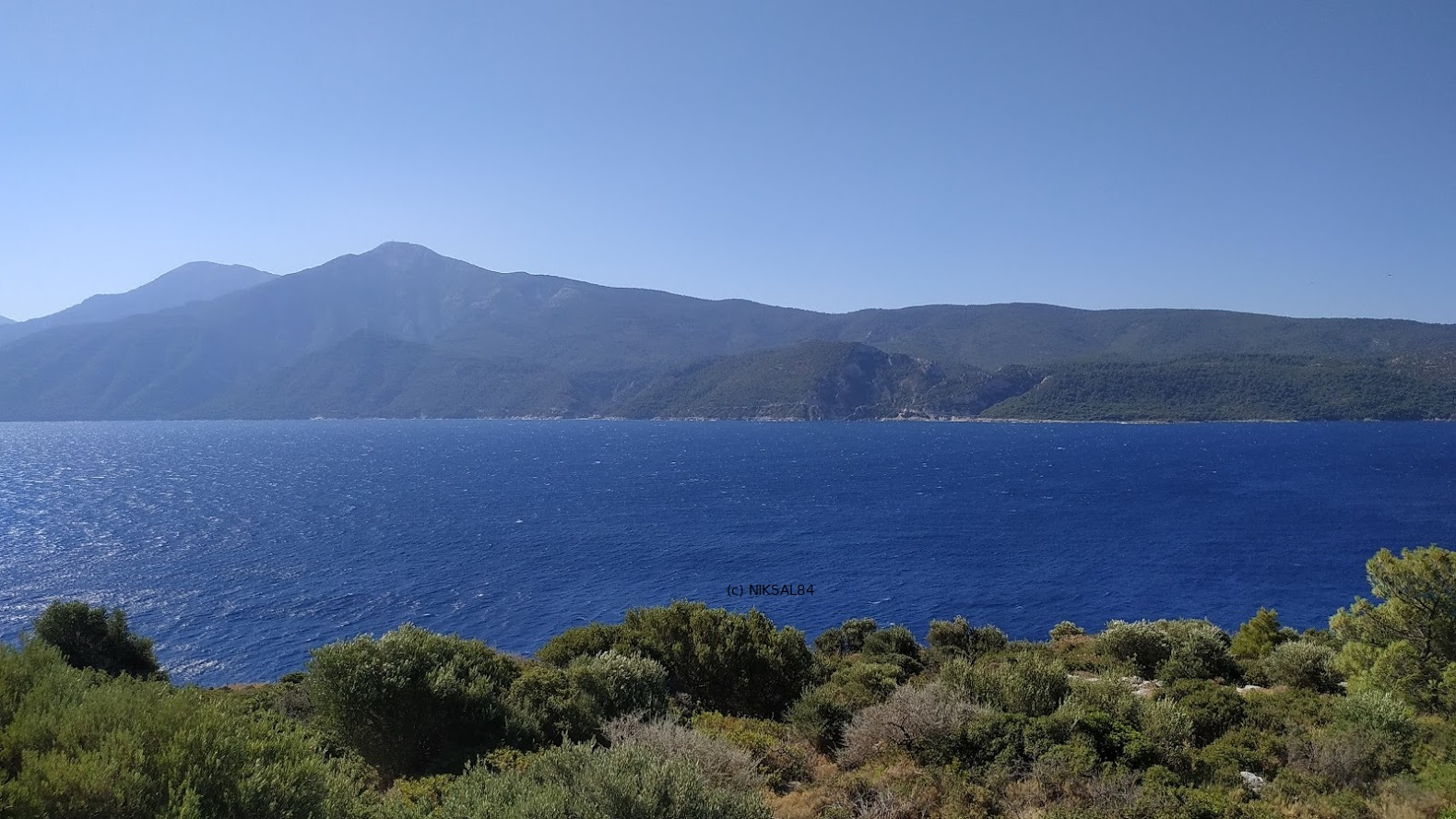
- Mount Mycale, or the Samsun Range, seen from Samos across the straits. The north is to the left. The whole thing was part of Melian territory. The main question about the location of Melia is whether it was at Fort Karion on the lower slopes or at Çatallar Tepe on the upper slopes.
- Interactive map of Melia

Melia (Ancient Greek: Μελία), was a Carian polis of ancient Ionia that was razed by decision of the Ionian League to which it belonged. This was the earliest known explicit action of that League. There are only a few references to it in the literary sources. However, it is mentioned in a long inscription of Priene, which records a land settlement case between Priene and Samos for the possession of lands formerly belonging to Melia but redistributed to some cities of the League on conclusion of the Meliakos polemos ("Meliac War"). A board of Rhodian arbitrators awarded the land, which included Fort Karion (Carium), to Priene, having determined through due diligence that Samos had received lands on the coastline north of Mycale, while the lands around the fort were given to Priene.

Unfortunately the locations of some of the key players of the inscription remain uncertain: Melia, the Panionion, and Old Priene. (The ruins of Priene currently in evidence are of the rebuilt city, as the old had been razed.) Fort Karion is considered fairly certainly identified. Various suggestions have been made as to the locations of the others, and until the 21st century Melia was believed to have been the same as or to have included Fort Karion on the hill Kale Tepe. Early in the 21st century (2004) Hans Lohmann, an archaeologist, after a survey disputed the accepted location and proposed another he considered more likely.

== The Kale Tepe theory ==
In this theory, Melia was Fort Karion on Kale Tepe, Güzelçamlı, Asiatic Turkey.

== The Çatallar Tepe theory ==
=== Location of Çatallar Tepe ===
In this theory Melia was on a ridge of Çatallar Tepe, an elevation of the heights of the Samsun Range, ancient Mount Mycale, modern Dilek Peninsula. The range is roughly east–west, except for its curvature. On the north is a coastal plain that once was north Ionia, now is the location of Kuşadası. Its southernmost neighborhood is Güzelçamlı, next to the range, just below the possible lowland candidate for Melia. A ravine leads from there upward through ascending hills into the heights. The heights give a view over the plain below. Typically the Aegean also is visible, and Samos across the straits. All this was Melian territory, with Ephesos at the northern end.

Lohmann in 2004 suspecting there was more to be said about the locations of Melia and the Panionion explored up the ravine reaching Kurşunlu Manastiri, the ruins of an abandoned Byzantine monastery at 37°42′19″N 27°17′00″E. The site is somewhat sprawling, with a parking lot at a little higher elevation. It is accessed by a winding dirt road ascending the steep slopes through thickets of forested trees. (Note: Google Maps has a street view of the road past this sprawling and well-attended site. There are also single street views.) The fact that the site has trees growing through it suggests that the area once was clear but has been allowed to become forested. The whole range is protected from development by its membership in the Dilek Peninsula-Büyük Menderes Delta National Park. The elevation of the monastery is about 600 m (2,000 ft).

Continuing eastward on the dirt road, at a further straight-line distance of about 2.32 km (1.44 mi), Lohmann found a hill, Findikli Kale (or Kalesi), which the road bypasses. The published coordinates are 37°41′54″N 27°18′40″E. The elevation is 532 m (1,745 ft). This hill features the ruins of a Byzantine castle.

The road continues eastward. According to Lohmann, "two kilometres east of the Byzantine fortification of Findikli Kale" is Çatallar Tepe. (Note: The straight-line distance is 2.32 km (1.44 mi). The road is partly accessible on Google Street View. Past the eastern end of the accessible road the scarp of the mountain is visible above the tree line.) The peak of the mountain rises over 800 m (2,600 ft). The prospective Melia "on the southwestern slope" is on a flat ridge at about 780 m (2,560 ft) more or less. Its coordinates are 37°42′06″N 27°19′42″E. The straight-line distance to Priene (New) is 5.29 km (3.29 mi), but there is obviously no easy connection along that line, and certainly not on a daily basis. In contrast to all the Ionian cities, this Melia was never a coastal city. Except for Mycale itself, its lands were all on the coastal plain north of Mycale.

== See also ==
- Dilek Peninsula-Büyük Menderes Delta National Park

== Reference bibliography ==
- ATEŞLİER, Suat; ERÖN, Aydın (2022). "Puranda ve Arkaik Priene'nin Lokalizasyonu Üzerine Yeni Bir Öneri: Samsun (Mykale) Dağı, Çatallar Tepe Mevkii: A New Suggestion on the Localization of Puranda and Archaic Priene: Mount Samsun (Mykale), Çatallar Tepe Precinct". Lycus Journal (in Turkish and English) (6): 65–97. doi:10.54577/lycus.1202362.
- Erön, Aydın; et al. (2022). "2020 Yili Kuşadasi İlçesı Ve Samsun (Myakale) Daği Arkeolojık Yüzey Araştirmasi Çalişmasi". In Keskın, Candaş (ed.). 2019-2020 Yili Yüzey Araştirmalari (in Turkish). Vol. 1. Ankara: Kültür Varlıkları ve Müzeler Genel Müdürlüğü. ISBN 978-975-17-5054-9.
- Frame, Douglas (2009). "10. The Panionic League". Hippota Nestor. Hellenic Studies 37. Center for Hellenic Studies, Harvard University.
- Lohmann, Hans (2012). "Ionians and Carians in the Mycale: the discovery of Carian Melia and the Archaic Panionion". In Gabriele Cifani; Simon Stoddart (eds.). Landscape, Ethnicity and Identity in the Archaic Mediterranean Area. Oxbow Books. ISBN 978-1-84217-433-3.
