= El Pueblito =

El Pueblito may refer to:

- El Pueblito, Catamarca, Argentina
- El Pueblito, Querétaro, the seat of Corregidora Municipality, Querétaro, Mexico
