= El Opeño =

Archaeological site in Jacona, Mexico

Tecuexe – Purépecha – Archaeological Site El Opeño archaeological site
- Interactive map of Tecuexe – Purépecha – Archaeological Site; El Opeño archaeological site
- 19°56′03″N 102°18′26″W
- Periods: Preclassical
- Cultures: Chichimeca – Tecuexe – Purépecha (Uto-Aztecan language – Purépecha language)
- Location: Jacona, current day known as, Michoacan, Mexico

History
- Built: 1300 BCE
- Abandoned: 200 BCE

El Opeño is a Mesoamerican archaeological site located in the municipality of Jacona in the state of Michoacán, Mexico. It is home to a prehispanic site, mainly known from the ceramic material found in the funerary complexes of the site, which have been dated to the Late Mesoamerican Preclassic period. The importance of this site in Mesoamerican archaeology is due to its antiquity and the ample diffusion of its style, contemporary to other native culture developments such as the Capacha culture and earlier than the Chupicuaro. The El Opeño tombs, the oldest in Mesoamerica, have been dated to around 1600 BCE - a similar period as Olmec culture development. The El Opeño discoveries have thus become a milestone that called the status of the Olmec culture as the founders or precursors of all Mesoamerican cultures into question. However, the current scientific understanding of the site and the culture that built it is incomplete, and requires further study.

== Name ==
The meaning of the name El Opeño is unclear, as is the original name of this site.

There are several theories about the etymology of the name Jacona. According to the Enciclopedia de los Municipios de México Michoacán, Jacona is a Chichimeca-origin word which means "place of vegetables". Another meaning comes from Xucunan, "place of flowers and vegetables".

Another version notes that Jacona (Xucunan) is a word from the Tecuexe, one of the Chichimec cultures, who probably spoke a Uto-Aztecan language.

== Background ==
In relation to this site's inhabitants or their culture there is no clear information; available text mentions several cultures, among other the Chichimeca, a subgroup of the chichimecas, the Tecuexe, Purépecha and another contemporary culture, the Capacha culture.

What is apparently clear, is that regardless of names assigned by scientists and scholars, the broad ancient Mexico region or Cem Anahuac, had many cultures and subcultures scattered in time and space, it is very likely that all had a common origin, the Nahuatl language and its derivations, and the many found similar archaeological evidence could corroborate this, regardless of the assigned name.

=== Purépecha culture ===
The Purépecha are an indigenous people centered in the northwestern region of the Mexican state of Michoacán, principally in the area of the cities of Uruapan and Pátzcuaro. There is an ongoing discussion about which term should be considered as the correct one.

=== Tecuexe culture ===
It is believed that the Tecuexe derived from the dispersion of Zacateco groups from La Quemada. Like the Zacatecos, the Tecuexe were a tribe belonging to the Chichimeca nation. It is known that they settled next to rivers which they used to their advantage to grow beans and corn. They were also expert artisans, carpenters and musicians. Toribio de Benavente Motolinia wrote "in any place ... all know [how] to work a stone, to make a simple house, to twist a cord and a rope, and the other subtle offices that do not require instruments or much art." The Tecuexe were known for their fierceness and cruelty towards their enemy. They were known to be so brave, it is said, that once, when the Mexica (Aztecs) came from Chicomostoc, Zacatecas to take control of Xolotl, (and course on to the lagoon where they found an eagle devouring a serpent) they attacked the settlers of Acatic, Teocaltiche, Mitic, Teocaltitán and Xalostotitlán, but in Tepatitlán, when they encountered the Tecuexe, having heard of their legendary cruelty, the Mexica avoided facing them.

=== Capacha culture ===
Capacha is an archaeological complex of Colima, the west of Mesoamerica. The Capacha Culture was the first with complex traits that developed in the region, approximately between the years 2000 and 1200 BC. It was studied and discovered by Isabel Truesdell Kelly, American archaeologist who made excavations in the area of Colima in the year 1939. The similarities between the pieces of this Culture and contemporary ceramics of the Ecuador region indicate that there were some very early relationships between western Mesoamerica and the Andean Cultures.

Capacha was contemporary to other important Mesoamerica cultural developments such as El Opeño, Michoacán, and the first Tlatilco phase, in the Valley of Mexico. The geographical extent of the Capacha pottery covers the entire Pacific coast between the Mexican States of Sinaloa, in the North, and Guerrero, in the South. Especially important are the burials uncovered by Gordon Ekholm in Guasave, Sinaloa.

== The Site ==
Archaeological evidence found in this site corresponds to the Preclassical horizon (1300 -200 BCE) settlements in evidence in this area. Jacona is one of the oldest towns of Michoacán and one of the first settlements dominated by and tributary of the Purépecha kingdom.

The current Jacona city (originally Xacona, derived from Xucunan) was founded in 1555 by Augustinian Friars, Jacona, placing it at about 16 kilometres from the old pre-Hispanic town which was called then "Pueblo Viejo" or "Jacona Vieja"

Xacona was established in a chichimeca (tecuexe) region, bordering the Purépecha kingdom. This explains why other neighboring places have Purépecha names. The main hill facing Jacona, for example, is called Curutarán.

Curutarán is a Purépecha language word, formed by the words: "ku", put together; "rhu", projection, tip; "tarha" play ball; and "an" gods. It means: "Point where the gods come together to play ball". This ball game was not a common game, but the "celestial ball game".

== Description ==
El Opeño consists of a funeral complex that is usually included in the Shaft tomb tradition that spread throughout much of the west of Mesoamerica on the territory of the current states of Jalisco, Colima, Nayarit and Michoacán. (Note: It must be emphasized that the concept "shaft tomb tradition" groups together a series of archaeological materials extensively discovered at burials of western Mesoamerica, although it is unknown the names of the peoples that carried on this funerary tradition. The ceramic styles of the regions that constitute the shaft tomb region have allowed establishing smaller groupings that provide a more specific approach to the history of that Mesoamerican region.) Burials at El Opeño, as in all where shaft burial materials have been found, are distinguished by their exceptional quality within the Mesoamerica framework. No other Mesoamerican people built this type of tradition of funerary monuments before their flourishing or after their decline. These are vertical (or nearly vertical) tombs excavated in the Tepetate or tuff which is part of the subsoil of the region. Access to the underground burial chambers had different means; for example in Nayarit, it is common for tombs to have a very deep shaft, although those in El Opeño had ladders.

In El Opeño twelve tombs were discovered, all of which show signs of architectural planning in the funerary complex. Also, the complex as a whole is organized into an overall plan.

These tombs can be considered the oldest antecedent of shaft tombs, which include this site archaeological material. The site architecture, as mentioned earlier, has very particular characteristics that were not included in the later necropoli of Jalisco, Colima, and Nayarit. The funeral architecture with similar or divergent characteristics was practiced by the peoples who lived in a wide continental region and at different periods in the prehispanic era. This region extends from western Mesoamerica down to northern Peru along the Pacific coast.

The geographical continuity and chronology of these practices requires deeper analysis to better understand the links between these peoples.

Neither remains nor evidence of the builders of the tombs have been found around the site. Hence they have been represented as a people who were in the transition towards sedentary agriculture that characterized mesoamerican urban societies of the mid-Preclassical. However, analysis of archaeological materials, both human bone remains and offerings found in the tombs, indicates that the tomb builders were members of a clearly sedentary people with a high social stratification as reflected in the differences of the offering goods.

== Regional connections ==
A large number of imported goods have been found in the area. They demonstrate the wealth and social networks of these peoples. Among these goods are

"... probable turquoise (from one of several possible locations in northern Mexico or New Mexico), jade from the Motagua Valley of Guatemala, marine shell from both the Pacific and Atlantic Casts, iron pyrite mirrors reminiscent of types made in Oaxaca, and green obsidian from Pachuca in central Mexico."

This exchange was mutual; obsidian from Michoacan was also being traded east into the Basin of Mexico, the Oaxaca Valley, and the Gulf Coast by that time.
