= Western Mexico shaft tomb tradition =

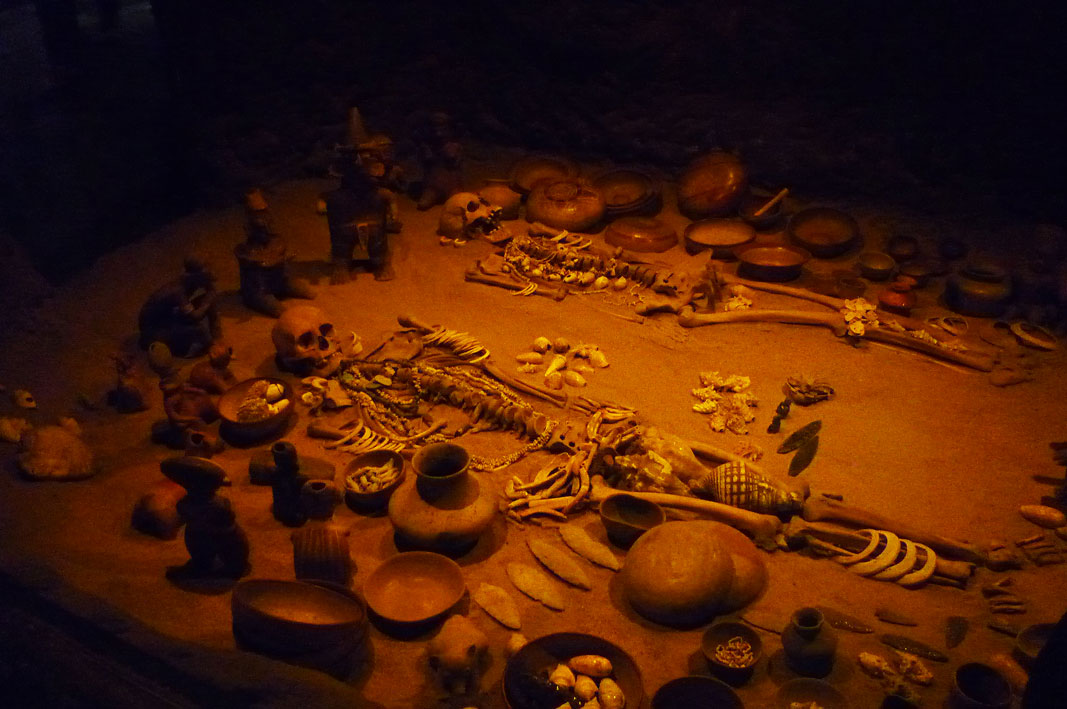
Reconstruction of excavated shaft tomb exhibited at the National Museum of Anthropology, Mexico.

The Western Mexico shaft tomb tradition refers to a set of interlocked cultural traits found in the western Mexican states of Jalisco, Nayarit, and, to a lesser extent, Colima to its south, roughly dating to the period between 300 BCE and 400 CE, although there is not wide agreement on this end date. Nearly all of the artifacts associated with this shaft tomb tradition have been discovered by looters and are without provenance, making dating problematic.

The first major undisturbed shaft tomb associated with the tradition was not discovered until 1993 at Huitzilapa, Jalisco.

Originally regarded as of Purépecha origin, contemporary with the Aztecs, it became apparent in the middle of the 20th century, as a result of further research, that the artifacts and tombs were instead over a thousand years older. Until recently, the looted artifacts were all that was known of the people and culture or cultures that created the shaft tombs. So little was known, in fact, that a major 1998 exhibition highlighting these artifacts was subtitled: "Art and Archaeology of the Unknown Past".

It is now thought that, although shaft tombs are widely diffused across the area, the region was not a unified cultural area. Archaeologists, however, still struggle with identifying and naming the ancient western Mexico cultures of this period.

== Description ==
Western Mexico archaeological sites. The orange circles show archaeological sites. The larger green circles highlight the most important sites. Note that the sites form what has been called the "shaft tomb arc" which extends from northwest Nayarit through the central Jalisco highlands and down to Colima.

The shaft tomb tradition is thought to have developed around 300 BCE. Some shaft tombs predate the tradition by more than 1000 years – for example, the shaft tomb at El Opeño in Michoacán has been dated to 1500 BCE but is linked to Central, rather than Western, Mexico. Like much else concerning the tradition, its origins are not well understood, although the valleys around Tequila, Jalisco, which include the archaeological sites of Huitzilapa and Teuchitlan, constitute its "undisputed core". The tradition lasted until at least 300 CE although there is not wide agreement on the end date.

The Western Mexico shaft tombs are characterized by a vertical or nearly vertical shaft, dug 3 to 20 meters down into what is often underlying volcanic tuff. The base of the shaft opens into one or two (occasionally more) horizontal chambers, perhaps 4 by 4 meters (varying considerably), with a low ceiling. The shaft tombs were often associated with an overlying building.

Multiple burials are found in each chamber and evidence indicates that the tombs were used for families or lineages over time. The labor involved in the creation of the shaft tombs along with the number and quality of the grave goods indicate that the tombs were used exclusively by the society's elites, and demonstrate that the shaft tomb cultures were highly stratified at this early date.

The sites of El Opeño and La Campana in Colima feature some shaft tombs, and are often associated with the Capacha culture.

== Ceramic figurines and tableaus ==
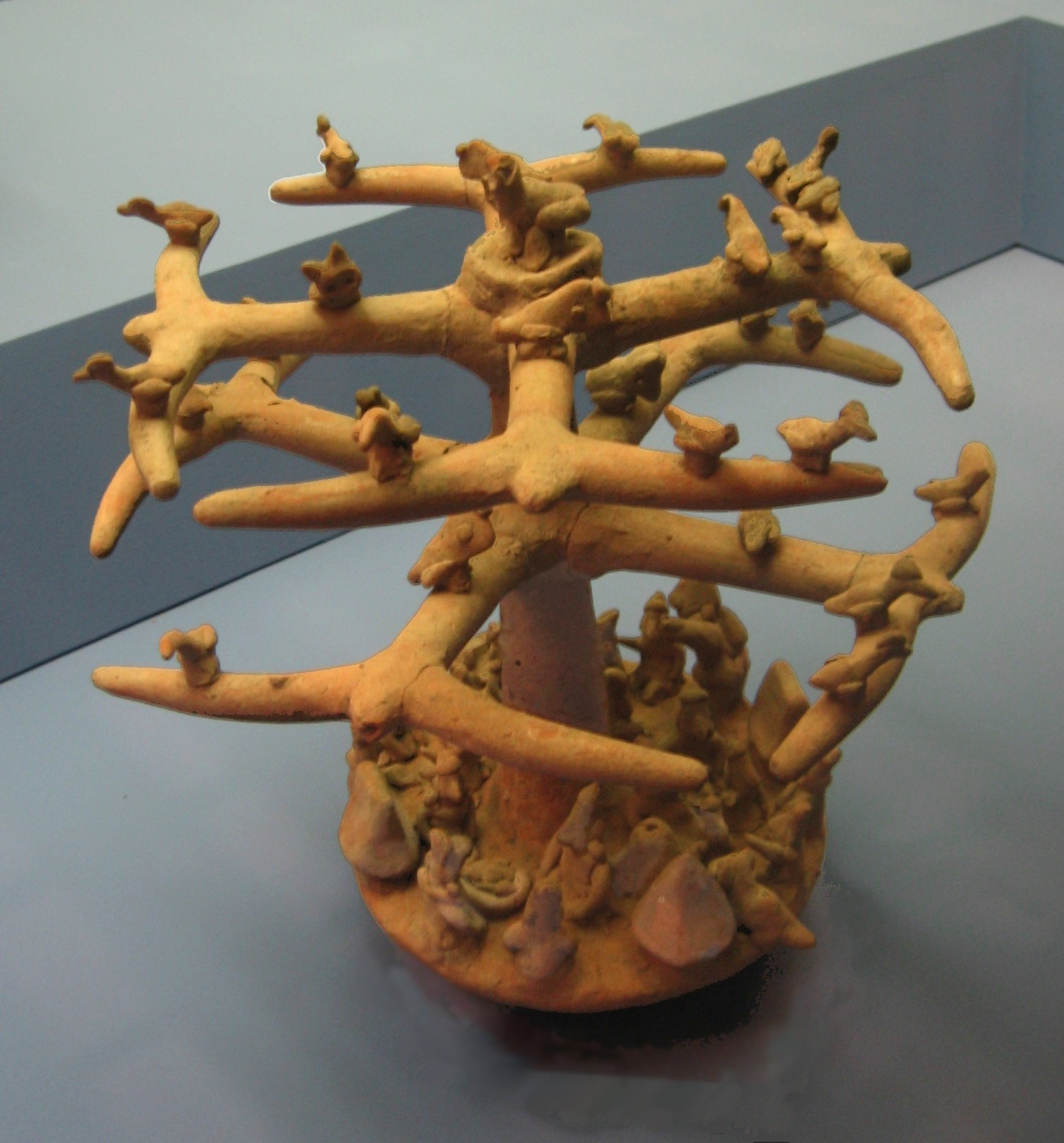
A Nayarit tableau showing a multi-layered tree with birds. It has been proposed that the birds represent souls who have not yet descended into the underworld, while the central tree may represent the Mesoamerican world tree.

Grave goods within these tombs include hollow ceramic figures, obsidian and shell jewelry, semi-precious stones, pottery (which often contained food), and other household implements such as spindle whorls and metates. More unusual items include conch shell trumpets covered with stucco and other appliques. Unlike those of other Mesoamerican cultures such as the Olmec and the Maya, shaft tomb artifacts carry little to no iconography and so are seemingly bereft of symbolic or religious meaning.

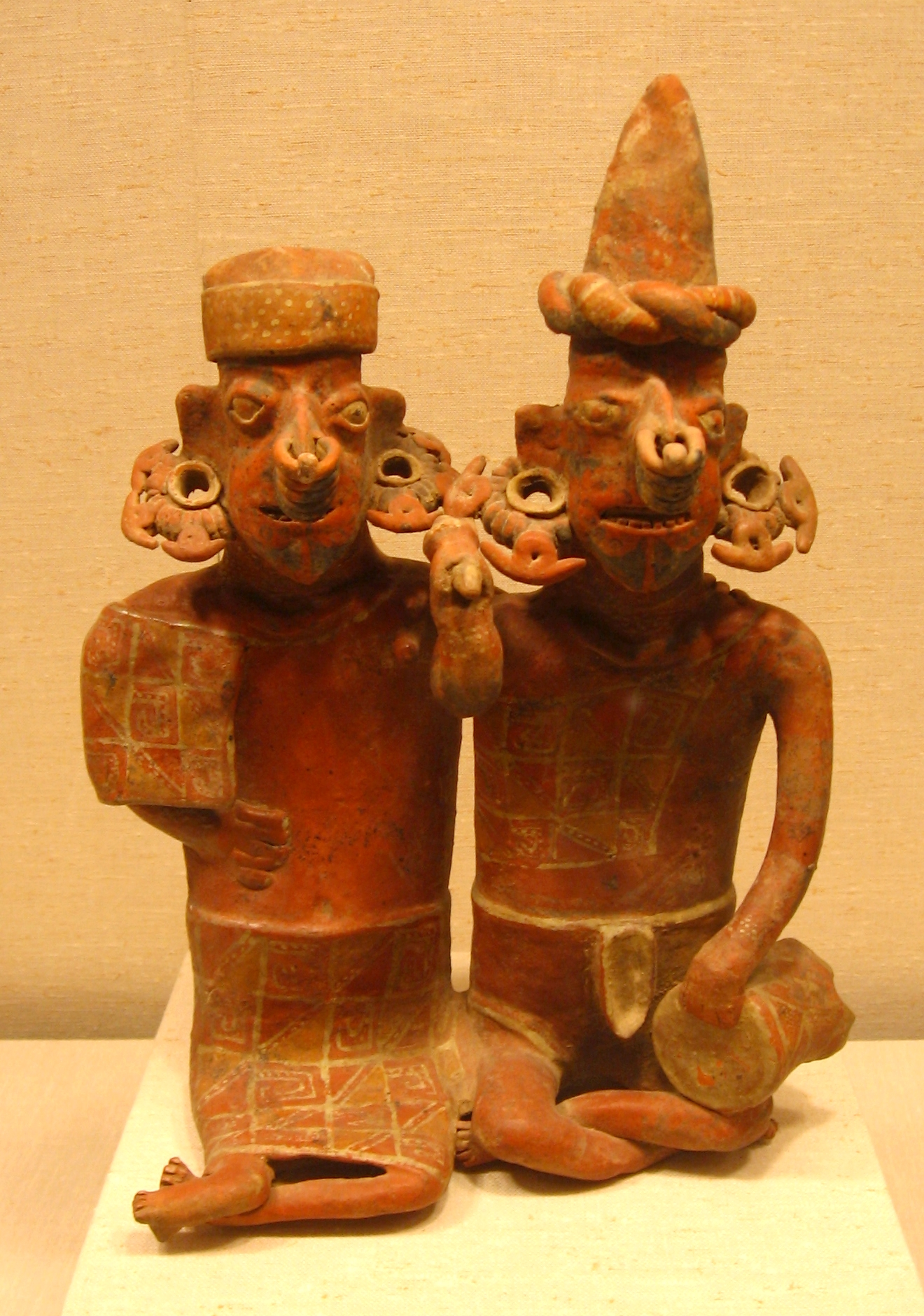
An ancestor pair from Nayarit, 100 BCE - 200 CE, executed in the Ixtlán del Río style.

The plentiful ceramic figurines have attracted the most attention, and are among the most dramatic and interesting produced in Mesoamerica. In fact, these ceramics were apparently the primary outlet for artistic expression for the shaft tomb cultures and there is little to no record of associated monumental architecture, stelae, or other public art.

Since the vast majority of these ceramics are without provenance, analysis has largely focused on the ceramics' styles and subjects.

=== Styles ===
The major stylistic groups include:

- Ixtlan del Rio. These abstract figurines have flat, squarish bodies with highly stylized faces complete with nose rings and multiple earrings. Seated figurines have thin rope-like limbs while the standing figurines have short stocky limbs. One of the first styles to be described, noted ethnographer, and caricaturist Miguel Covarrubias stated that it "reaches the limits of absurd, brutal caricature, a peculiar aesthetic concept that relishes the creation of haunting subhuman monstrosities". Art historian George Kubler finds that "the square bodies, grimacing mouths, and staring eyes convey a disturbing expression which is only in part resolved by the animation and plastic energy of the turgid forms".

A Chinesco-style figurine (Type C), showing the archetypal puffy, slit-like eyes and short tapered legs.

- "Chinesca" or "Chinesco" figurines were named by art dealers after their supposed Chinese-like appearance. An early type, Chinesco is identified with Nayarit and up to five major subgroups have been identified, although there is considerable overlap. Type A figurines, the so-called "classic Chinesco", are realistically rendered. One prominent curator, Michael Kan, finds that "their calm, subtle exterior suggests rather than demonstrates emotion". These Type A figures are so similar to one another that it has been suggested that they were the production of a single "school". Types B through E are more abstract, characterized by puffy, slit-like eyes blended into the face, and broad rectangular or triangular heads. These figures are often shown seated or reclining, with shortened bulbous legs quickly tapering to a point.
- The Ameca style, associated with Jalisco, is characterized by an elongated face and a high forehead which is often capped by braids or turban-like headgear. The aquiline nose is also elongated and the large eyes are wide and staring, with pronounced rims created by adding separate strips of clay ("fillets") around the eyes. The wide mouth is closed or slightly opened and the large hands have carefully delineated nails. Kubler detects both an early "sheep-faced" style that seem "eroded or melted in the continuous passages of modelling that unite rather than divide the parts of the body" and a later style which are "more animated and more incisively articulated".

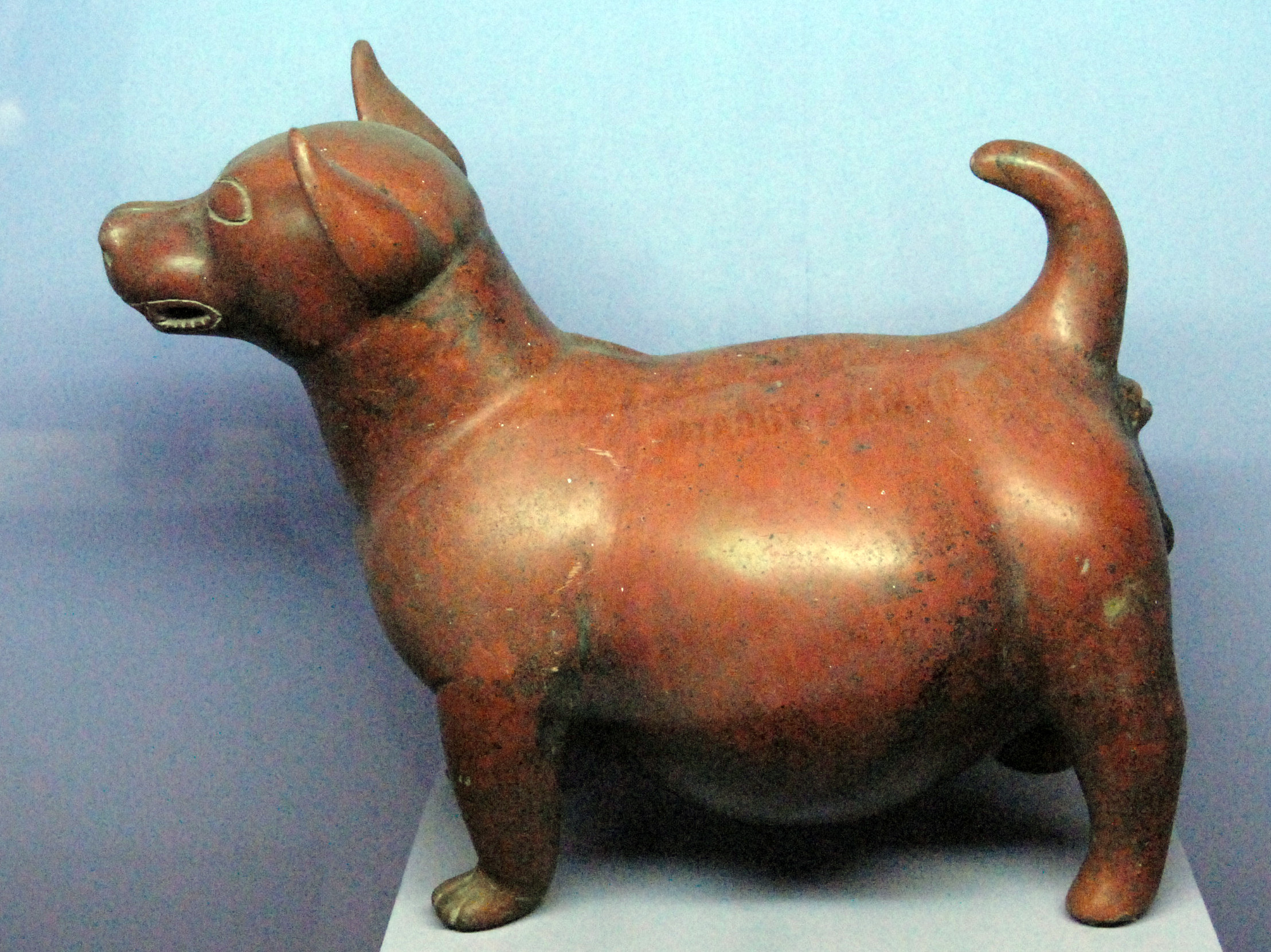
A fat, and perhaps fattened, dog from Colima

- Colima ceramics can be identified by their smooth, round forms and their warm brown-red slip. Colima is particularly known for its wide range of animal, especially dog, figurines. Human subjects within the Colima style are more "mannered and less exuberant" than other shaft tomb figurines.

Other styles include El Arenal, San Sebastián, and Zacatecas. Although there is general agreement on style names and characteristics, it is not unanimous. Moreover, these styles often overlap to one degree or another, and many figurines defy categorization.

=== Subject matter ===
Common subjects of shaft tomb tradition ceramics are:

- Ceramic tableaus showing several or even several dozen people engaged in various seemingly typical activities. Concentrated in highland Nayarit and adjoining Jalisco, these tableaus present rich ethnographic insight into funerary practices, the Mesoamerican ballgame, architecture (most importantly perishable architecture), and perhaps even religious thought during the late Formative period.

Some tableaus are almost photographic in their detail and have even been associated with architecture ruins in the field.

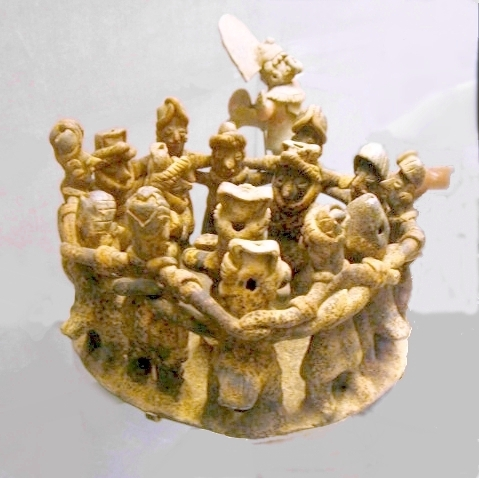
A characteristic circular ceramic tableau showing more than a dozen musicians and dancers

- Ceramic dogs are widely known from looted tombs in Colima. Dogs were generally believed in Mesoamerican cultures to represent soul guides of the dead and several dog ceramics wear human masks. Nonetheless, it should also be noted that dogs were often the major source of animal protein in ancient Mesoamerica.
- Ancestor (or marriage) pairs of female and male figurines are common among shaft tomb tradition grave goods. These figurines, perhaps representing ancestors, may be joined or separate and often are executed in the Ixtlán del Río style.
- Many shaft tomb figurines, spanning various Western Mexico styles and locations, wear a horn set high on the forehead. Several theories have been advanced for these horns: that they show that the figure is a shaman, that they are abstract conch shells (a not uncommon shaft tomb relic) and as such, are an emblem of rulership, or are a phallic symbol. These theories are not mutually exclusive.

=== Uses ===
While these ceramics were obviously recovered as grave goods, there is a question of whether they were specifically created for a mortuary rite, or whether they were used prior to burial, perhaps by the deceased. While some ceramics do show signs of wear, it is as yet unclear whether this was the exception or the rule.

== Context ==
=== Western Mexico cultures ===
Considerable effort has been made connecting the shaft tomb tradition to the Teuchitlán tradition, a complex society that occupies much the same geography as the shaft tomb tradition.

Unlike the typical Mesoamerican pyramids and rectangular central plazas, the Teuchitlán tradition is marked by central circular plazas and unique conical pyramids. This circular architectural style is seemingly mirrored in the many circular shaft tomb tableau scenes. Known primarily from this architecture, the Teuchitlán tradition rises at roughly the same time as the shaft tomb tradition, 300 BCE, but lasts until 900 CE, many centuries after the end of the shaft tomb tradition. The Teuchitlán tradition then appears to be an outgrowth and elaboration of the shaft tomb tradition.

=== Mesoamerican cultures ===
Because western Mexico is on the very periphery of Mesoamerica, it has long been considered outside the Mesoamerican mainstream and the cultures at this time appear to be particularly insulated from many mainstream Mesoamerican influences. For example, no Olmec-influenced artifacts have been recovered from shaft tombs, nor are any Mesoamerican calendars or writing systems in evidence, although some Mesoamerican cultural markers, particularly the Mesoamerican ballgame, are present.

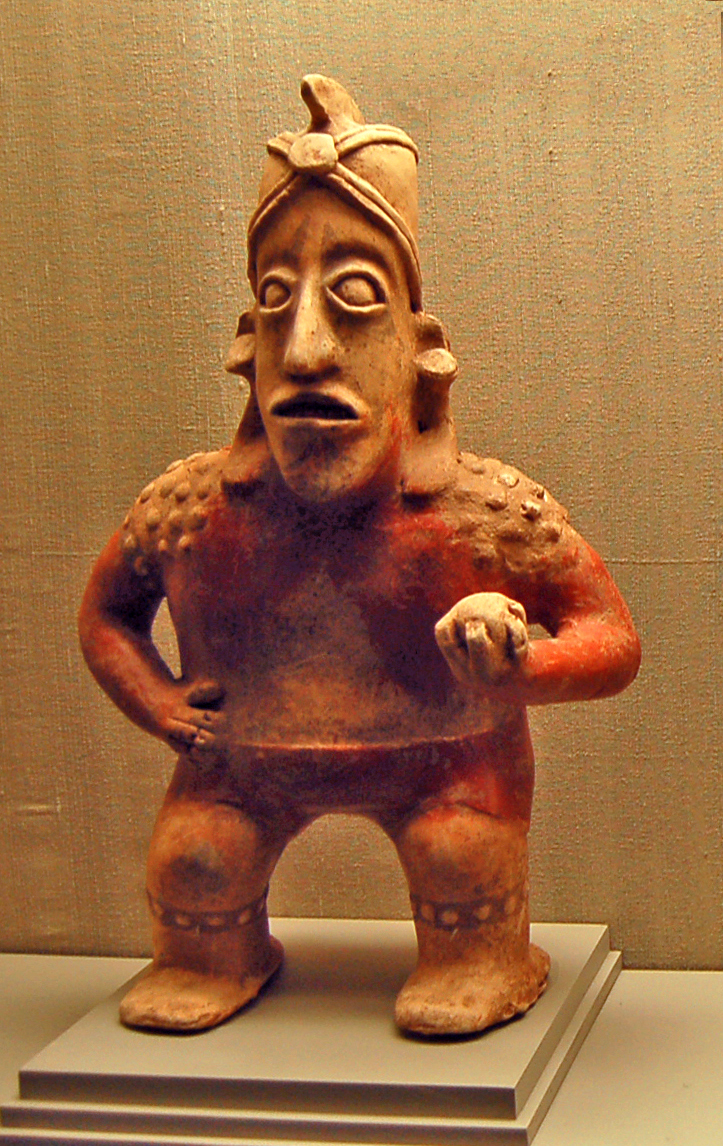
An Ameca-style figurine from Jalisco. The crest is a not-uncommon feature of many tradition figurines. The ball would appear to link the subject to the Mesoamerican ballgame.

Despite this, the inhabitants of this area lived much like their Mesoamerican counterparts elsewhere. The usual trio of beans, squash, and maize was supplemented with chiles, manioc and other tubers, various grains, and with animal protein from domestic dogs, turkeys, and ducks, and from hunting. They lived in thatched roof wattle-and-daub houses, grew cotton and tobacco, and conducted some long-distance trade in obsidian and other goods.

Shaft tombs themselves are not encountered elsewhere in Mesoamerica and their nearest counterparts come from northwestern South America.

=== South American shaft tombs ===
Shaft tombs also appear in northwestern South America in a somewhat later timeframe than western Mexico (e.g. 200-300 CE in northern Peru, later in other areas). To Dorothy Hosler, Professor of Archaeology and Ancient Technology at MIT, "The physical similarities between the northern South American and West Mexican tomb types are unmistakable." while art historian George Kubler finds that the western Mexican chambers "resemble the shafted tombs of the upper Cauca river in Colombia". However, others disagree that the similarity of form demonstrates cultural linkages—Karen Olsen Bruhns states that "this sort of contact . . . seems mainly in the (muddled) eye of the synthesizer".

However, other linkages between Western Mexico and northwestern South America have been proposed, in particular the development of metallurgy. See Metallurgy in pre-Columbian Mesoamerica.

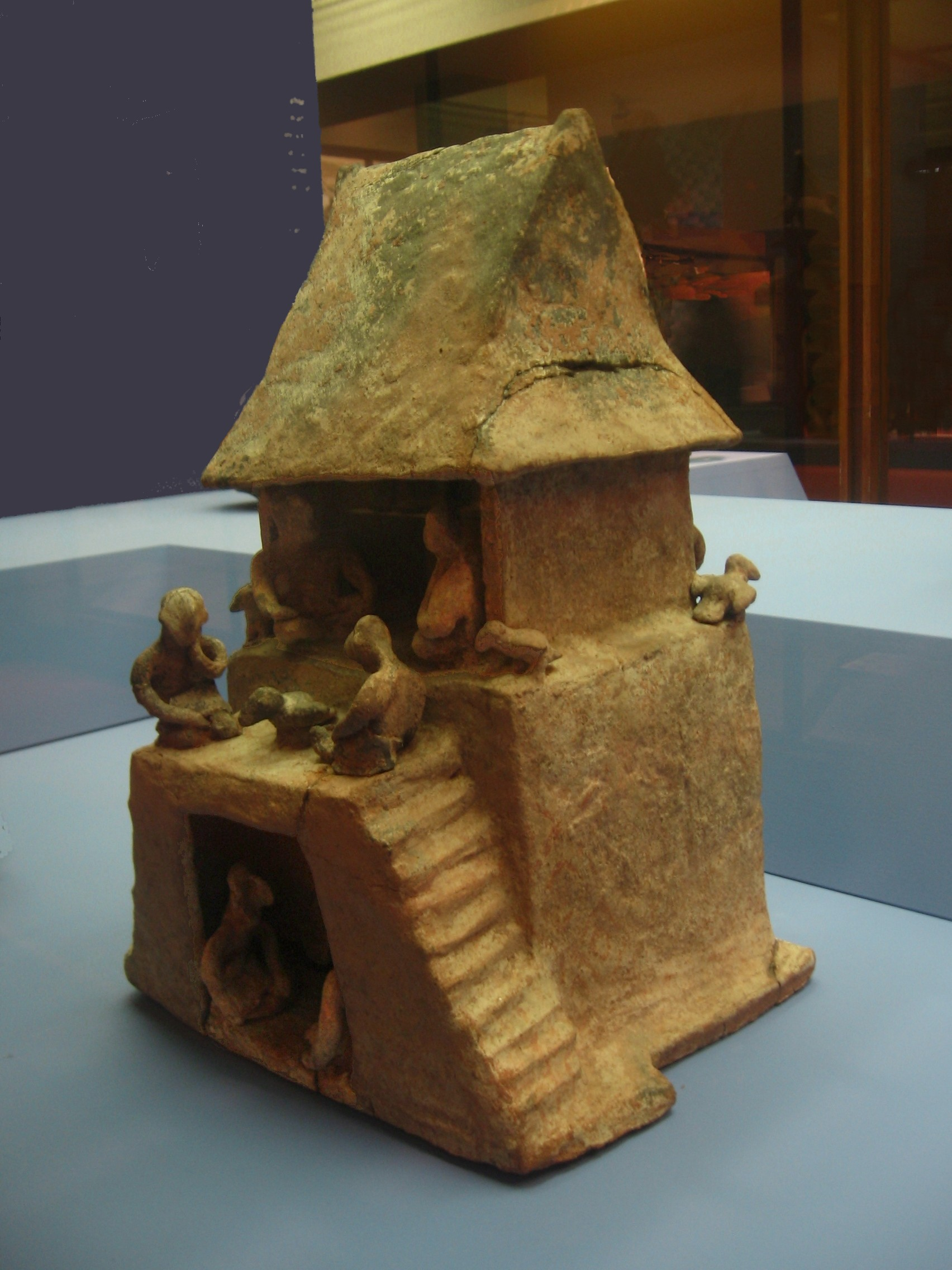
A ceramic house showing the distinctive roof associated not only with the shaft tomb cultures but the subsequent Teuchitlan tradition as well. It has been proposed that these models show the house of the living above and attached to the house of the dead.

== History of scholarly research ==
The first major work to discuss artifacts associated with the shaft tomb tradition was Carl Sofus Lumholtz's 1902 work, Unknown Mexico. Along with illustrations of several of the grave goods, the Norwegian explorer described a looted shaft tomb he had visited in 1896. He also visited and described the ruins of Tzintzuntzan, the seat of the Tarascan state some 250 kilometres (160 mi) to the east, and was one of the first to incorrectly use the term "Tarascan" (Purépecha) to describe the shaft tomb artifacts.

During the 1930s, artist Diego Rivera began accumulating many Western Mexico artifacts for his private collection, a personal interest that sparked a wider public interest in West Mexican grave goods. It was in the late 1930s that one of the most prominent of Western Mexico archaeologists, Isabel Truesdell Kelly, began her investigations. In the period from 1944 until 1985, Kelly would eventually publish over a dozen scholarly papers on her work in this region. In 1948, she was the first to hypothesize the existence of the "shaft tomb arc", the geographic distribution of shaft tomb sites over western Mexico (see map above).

In 1946, Salvador Toscano challenged the attribution of shaft tomb artifacts to the Purépechans, a challenge that was echoed in 1957 by Miguel Covarrubias who firmly declared that Purépecha culture appeared only "after the 10th century". Toscano's and Covarrubias's views were later upheld by radiocarbon dating of plundered shaft tombs' charcoal and other organic remains salvaged in the 1960s by Diego Delgado and Peter Furst. As the result of these excavations and his ethnological investigations of the modern-day indigenous Huichol and Cora peoples of Nayarit, Furst proposed that the artifacts were not only mere representations of ancient peoples, but also contained deeper significance. The model houses, for example, showed the living dwelling in context with the dead – a miniature cosmogram – and the horned warriors (as discussed above) were shaman battling mystical forces.

In 1974, Hasso von Winning published an exhaustive classification of Western Mexico shaft tomb artifacts (including, for example, the Chinesco A through D types mentioned above), a classification still largely in use today.

The 1993 discovery of an unlooted shaft tomb at Huitzilapa is the latest major milestone, providing "the most detailed information to date on the funerary customs" associated with shaft tomb tradition.

== See also ==
- La Campana (archaeological site)
- Naguals, mythical shape-shifters often portrayed on West Mexico ceramics.

== Notes ==
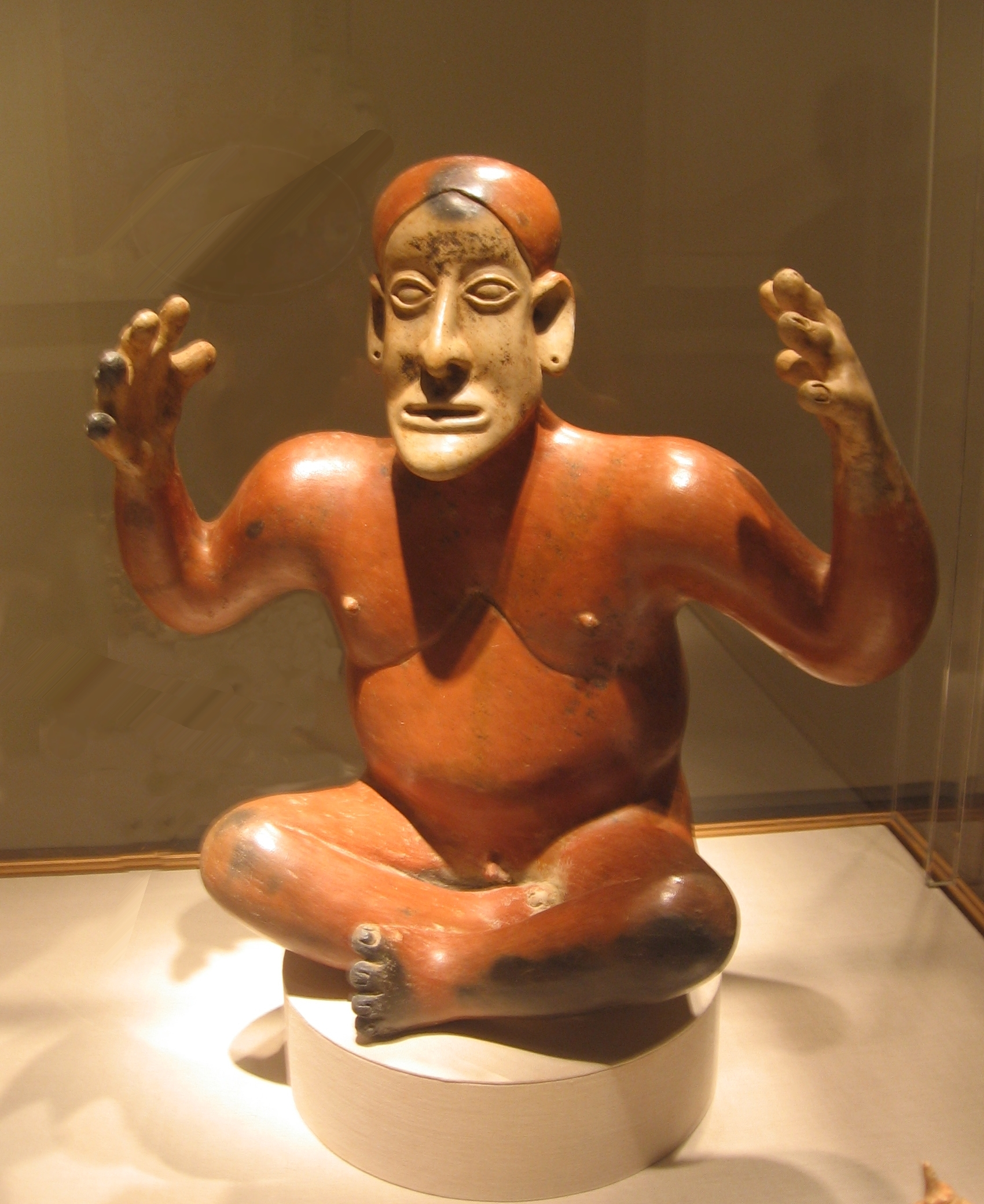
An Ameca-style figurine from Jalisco. Height: 22 in (56 cm).

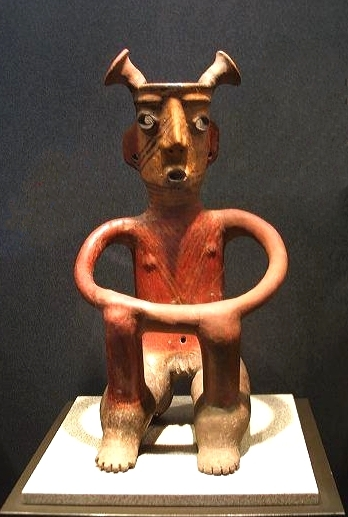
A Zacatecas style ceramic figurine showing the distinctive horns (perhaps bundles of hair) found on male figurines. Both male and female figurines display the characteristic flat-top heads and rope-like arms.
