= El Cerrito (archaeological site) =

Archeological site in Mexico

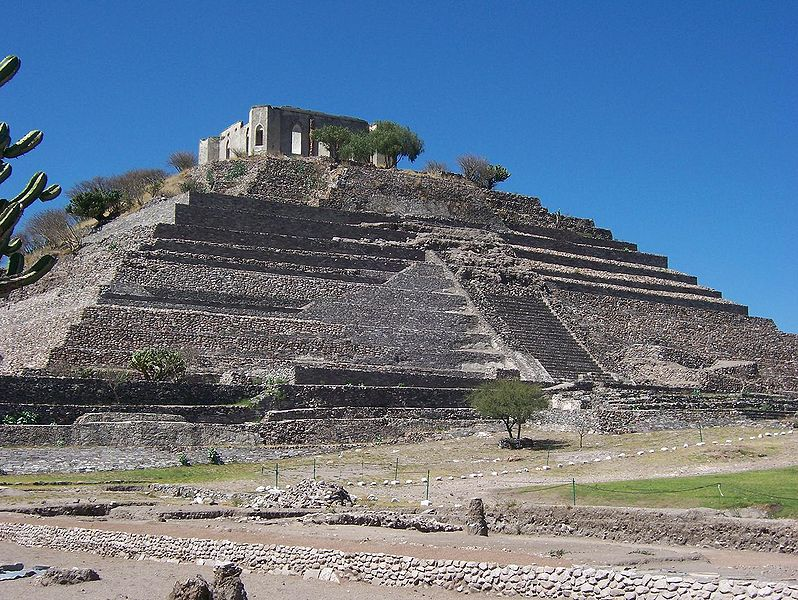
- The pyramid of El Pueblito at El Cerrito

- Location within Mexico
- 20°33′3″N 100°26′33″W
- Type: Settlement
- Periods: Formative stage to Post-Classic stage
- Cultures: Chupícuaro, Teotihuacan, Toltec, Chichimeca
- Location: Corregidora, Querétaro, Mexico

History
- Built: Approximately 300 BCE
- Abandoned: Approximately 1700 CE

Site notes
- Management: Centro INAH Querétaro
- Public access: Yes
- Website: Zona Arqueológica El Cerrito (in Spanish)

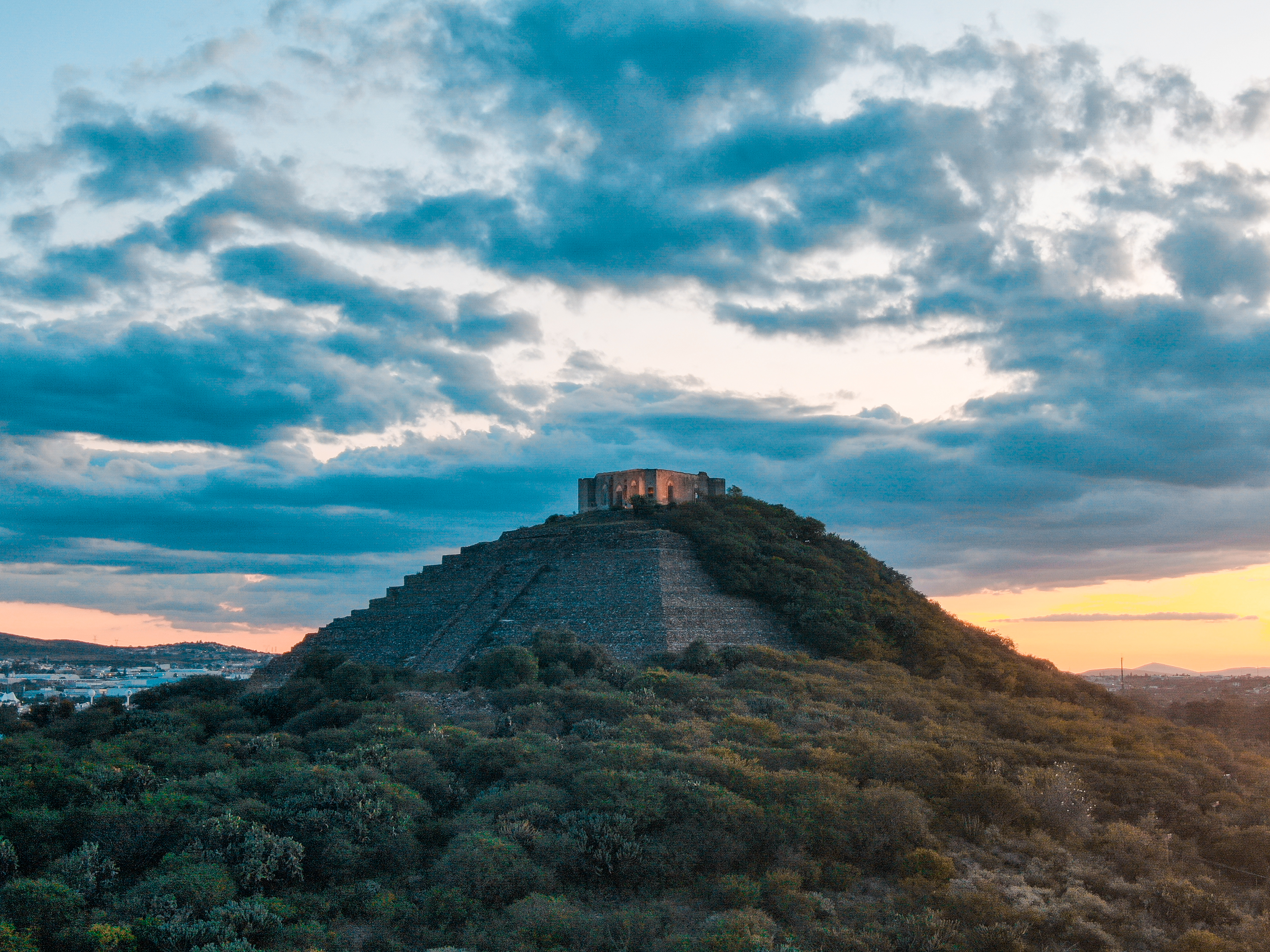
El Pueblito pyramid

El Cerrito is an archaeological zone in the central Mexican state of Querétaro. It is located in the municipality of Corregidora on the outskirts of the state capital, Santiago de Querétaro.

As a place of worship, it was venerated by local cultures (Chupícuaro) as well as Teotihuacanos, Toltecs, Chichimeca, Otomi and Purépecha, as late as 1632.

The first human settlements in Querétaro are related to the Chupícuaro culture, which originated in the margins of the Lerma River, in the current Acámbaro, Guanajuato. This presence is more noticeable and early in San Juan del Río and Querétaro. Chupícuaro culture had a simple low platform architecture, very elaborate funeral rites, and elaborate pottery decoration. Material evidence of this culture has been registered on sites located in the skirts of the Cimatario Hill on the banks of the Pueblito River.

Magdalena to the west and La Griega, to the east are further evidence of this culture in the Valley of Querétaro. The earliest settlements in Querétaro were related and contemporary to the Chupícuaro culture in the mesoamerican preclassical period. From the social, political and territorial structure of Chupícuaro, inhabitants of the Querétaro region developed their own cultural expressions within the context of the Mesoamerican civilization.

== Site investigation ==
- Some main walls of the pyramid are discovered. Archaeologist Carlos Margain. (1941)
- A map is prepared, some sampling, and exploration wells, determining extent of the archaeological site. Archaeologist Ana Ma. Crespo (1984)
- Land recuperation and some excavations at the ceremonial center. (1995)
- The site El Cerrito is declared an archaeological monument. (November 9, 2000)

== History ==
Since 300 BCE, The Chupícuaro culture settled in the region, followed by the Teotihuacan and Toltec, and then the Chichimeca and Otomi, immediately prior to the Spaniards' arrival at the valley of Querétaro.

Towards 400 CE, the Altépetl, the ceremonial center and its pre-Hispanic urban zone, becomes the political and religious capital of several peripheric settlements.

El Cerrito had a long history as a regional political and religious center, and was contemporary of Teotihuacan and Tula. As a regional capital, it had a series of urban religious and residential complexes in Cerro Gordo, Balvanera, La Magdalena, Santa Barbara, La Negreta and the banks of the River El Pueblito.

El Cerrito functioned as a regional political and religious center of regional importance from 400 to 1500 CE. Its apogee occurred in the postclassical period, from 450 to 850 CE, during the Toltec culture influence of the center.

Over time, El Cerrito became a sacred space or sanctuary. The buildings and altars around the pyramid are expressions of religious activities around the worship of a female deity, probably the old mother or mother of the gods.

During the Spaniards' arrival, it was populated by Chichimecas, a sedentary and semi-nomadic culture, with the addition of Otomi and Purépecha.

=== Apogee ===
The most intense occupation period is associated with the Toltec culture in the early postclassical (900-1200 CE). El Cerrito is one of the most important sites of the Toltec world, a Tollan or site where the power of the great lords and warriors of the region was legitimized. It is possible that through these rituals it maintained the Toltec cosmogony.

During that period, it went from being a local ceremonial center to a regional shrine. Ceramic pieces found (vases, figurines and malacates) provide evidence of trade networks with remote regions, as far as Tajumulco in Guatemala to the south, and the Huasteca and Los Altos de Jalisco to the north.

=== Fall ===
Around 1,200 CE, the Toltec groups left the Valley with the consequential decline of ceremonial center functions. During the late postclassical era, various ethnic groups continued to live in the Valley, and partially used the site for their ceremonies, especially the pyramid. El Cerrito would not regain the splendor reached with the Toltec, but its recognition as a sacred space open to prehispanic deities continued well into the 17th century.

According to Franciscan records (1632), Chichimeca, Otomi and Purépecha natives continued to make offerings at the altar. The religious order placed an image of Mary at the site, to transform the prehispanic cult held onsite for over 1000 years.

== The site ==
El Cerrito archaeological site, also known as "El Pueblito pyramid", is a magnificent example of the influence that the Toltec culture reached in the area.

El Cerrito Toltec monumental architecture integrated two architectural types of constructions, the sunken patios and palaces or rooms with columns.

=== Constructive stages ===
Per recent excavations, the pyramid has three different constructive stages:

- First Stage. At the ceremonial center and pyramid, engraved stones were found, forming a vertical wall, with an 80 metros per side basement, it is dated in the epiclassical.
- Second Stage. It is part of the ceremonial center, with limestone walls forming panels and slopes, probably with bas-relief sculptures and battlements, during the early postclassical.
- Third Stage. It has large sloped walls made with basalt stone, covered with stucco, altar type structures, embedded in walls, during the late postclassical and the 16th century.

== Structures ==
Used stone plates for construction, with decoration engravings in walls, altars and sidewalks. The motifs include representations of historical and mythical characters, war markers, calendar glyphs, symbols, and numerous attributes terrestrial, aquatic and astral of the Quetzalcoatl deity. The material used includes bas-relief engraved slabs, for finishing they were painted with mineral pigments of colors blue, red, yellow, white and black.

=== Large pyramid ===
It is a large elongated platform, partially destroyed and cut in the middle by the access road. As part of the main structure, Chac Mool sculptures, atlantes or columns walls were found. The Platform is 130 meters long, 30 meters wide, the height is not known, from its deterioration.

Was built on a leveled platform 118 m per side. On this platform the pyramid was built, it is 30 meters high. It consists of thirteen small bodies slope-staggered, for construction basalt stone and red sandstone were used, the structure was stuccoed and painted in red and ochre colors. Each of its facades had large stairways delimited by “alfardas” (intermediate side walls).

=== Palace ===
Between the Sculpture Plaza and La Danza, as palace was built, where small altars were found, with abundant offerings associated; clay braziers almost a meter in height. This Palace, in addition to dividing the site, provided privacy in the squares, necessary for ritual functions. The façade towards each of the squares was formed by a portico, this is a roofed area supported by wooden columns decorated with stone and stucco painted in red and blue crowning.

=== Quadrangular Plaza ===
It is enclosed by a stone wall that reaches up to six meters in height, the South side is 290 meters long and the west side is 225 meters long.

=== Plaza La Danza ===
Located northeast of the platform is built by a system of stone boxes, the west facade of the square is sloped and is covered with stuccoed basalt stones and red paint.

=== Sculptures Plaza ===
It is of the sunken patio type. Is located at the southeast corner of the pyramid basement, the best preserved, it is 72 metres long by 60 wide, altars were built at the ends eastern and western ends, with a sloped wall. At this place two offerings were found, consisting of skulls and smokers, it is referred to as the skulls altar or Tzompantli.

== Sculptures ==
All El Cerrito and ceremonial center structures, contained sculptures fragments, indicating their importance and of the sculpted architectural elements, part of the construction and decoration of the site.

The sculptures have traces of having been painted in colors red, yellow and blue, sometimes covered with stucco.

The facades and cornices of the building and the walls of the structures were decorated.

Battlements have been found in the form of snails and crossed arrows with floral motifs and chalchihuites drums, all forming friezes and frames.

== Ceramic ==
Ceramic found include shapes and decoration of pots, boxes and jugs. Most articles are for ceremonial rituals, as smokers, braziers, ollas, Tlaloc, pipes vases, Mazapa figurines and clay malacates.
