= Capacha =

Archaeological site in Colima State, Mexico

Complejo Capacha
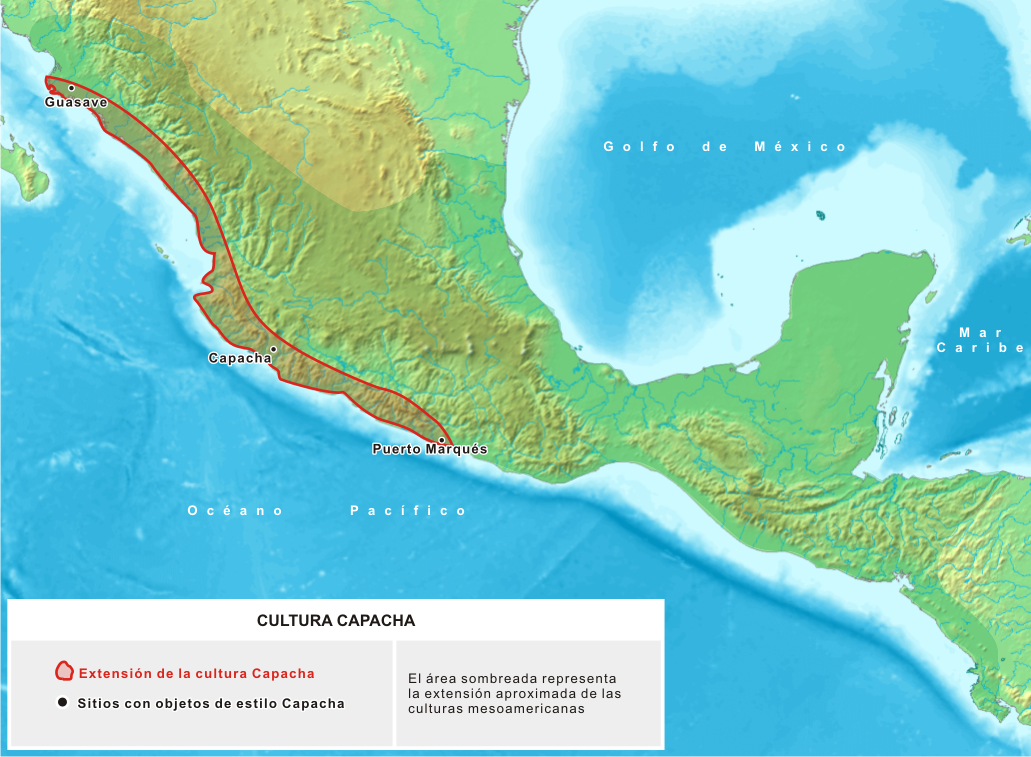
- Capacha culture extension Map
- Interactive map of Complejo Capacha
- 19°16′54″N 103°41′28″W
- Type: Mesoamerican archaeology
- Periods: Mesoamerican Preclassical, Classical, Postclassical
- Cultures: Capacha
- Location: Colima, Colima; Mexico
- Region: Mesoamerica

History
- Built: 2000 to 1000 BCE

Capacha is an archaeological site located about 6 kilometers northeast of the Colima Municipality, in the Mexican state of Colima. This site is the heart of the ancient Mesoamerican Capacha Culture.

The Capacha Culture peoples were located between the Jalisco Sierra Madre Occidental and the Colima Valley. Several sites in the region have relations with Capacha, such as the Embocadero II site (800 BCE) in the Mascota Valley, which has a background with the shaft tomb tradition. There is also evidence of green stone articles, Jadeite cylindrical beads and possibly Amazonite, as well as Turquoise fragments.

It is known there were close relations between Capacha and El Opeño, by the existing ceramic relationship between types red zonal and dark red/beige, as well as similarities between figurine types of both complexes.

This information is corroborated by Opeño style figurines and Capacha type ceramic found in the area of Tuxpan - Tamazula - Zapotlán; as well as in other places in Jalisco, where shaft tombs similar to El Opeño and ceramic vessels similar to Capacha were found.

In addition, the culture and Capacha had some kind of contact with cultures of the Center of Mexico, e.g. Tlatilco, between 1300 and 900 BCE, which probably had a higher level of development at that time. Beatriz Braniff and other researchers pointed the presence of a "tertium quid" in central Mexico differentiated from Olmec traditions and the center of Mexico, whose origin was the western region.

== Background ==
During prehispanic times, the region covered by the modern-day state of Colima was seat of various ethnic groups which flourished in western Mexico. The region was inhabited by various Lordships that disputed the territories. At the beginning of the 16th century, Purépecha groups dominated several regions, the Tzacoalco salt mines owned by Tecos, because of this their leader Coliman or Tlatoani Colimotl defeated them, after the salt war, the Tecos took Sayula, Zapotlán and Amula and even reached Mazamitla, becoming the predominant group.

=== Culture origin ===
Archaeologists recognize the origin of Mesoamerica in a "mother culture" represented by the Olmec style and culture. But in the western region no evidence has been found to date nothing that can be identified as such. Indeed, there is no evidence even of Teotihuacan (central Mesoamerican influence from the Classic period.)

It is clear that Colima and other western regions' cultures had their own personality. The Colima artistic expressions in ceramic offerings in “shaft tombs" reflect a society more "comfortable", free, equal, with family and household traits, totally different from artistic expressions of other societies. The detail and artistic quality of women, men, dogs, parrots, bats, snakes, etc., sculptures, evidence that artists carefully observed those everyday items.

Who were these special ancestors? Recent excavations in Colima and Michoacán enable us to recognize at least two roots, as old as the Olmec. These are Capacha and El Opeño. Capacha, before 1500 BCE had burials that include beautiful ceramic "bules" and vases with "Stirrup” handle, certain type figurines and metates.

=== Discovery ===
It was discovered and studied by Isabel Truesdell Kelly, American archaeologist who made excavations in the Colima area in 1939. Similarities between pieces of this culture and contemporary ceramics in the region of Ecuador suggest that there were some very links between the early western Mesoamerican cultures and those of the Andes.

== Capacha Culture ==
By this name is known the Capacha archaeological site in Colima. Was the first with complex features and developed in the region, approximately between 2000 and 1200 BCE.

Capacha was contemporary of other important regional cultural developments, such as El Opeño, Michoacán, and the first Tlatilco phase in the Valley Mexico. The geographical spread of ceramic Capacha parts covers the Pacific coast, between the states of Sinaloa in the north, and Guerrero in south. Particularly important are the burials discovered by Gordon F. Ekholm in Guasave, Sinaloa.

=== Cultural Stages ===
The cultural development of this area has been divided into seven phases, named for the sites where findings were made;

- Capacha Phase
- Ortices Phase
- Comala Phase
- Colima Phase
- Armería Phase
- Chanal Phase and
- Periquillos Phase.

=== Cultures Chronology ===
Period	Phase	From year	To year	Description
Early Preclassical^{2500 BC–1200 BC}	Capacha Phase	1500 BC	1000 BC	Pottery was associated to funeral rites. The pottery characteristic shapes were guaje or bule.
Mid-Preclassical^{1200 BC–400 BC}	Ortices Phase	500 BC	500	Shaft tombs develop, burial chambers below ground, with anthropomorphic or zoomorphic vessels.
Late Preclassical^{400 BC–200}		400 BC	200	Ortices Phase continues and Comala Phase begins.
Early Classical^{200–600}	Comala Phase	100	700	The Shaft Tomb tradition continued. Ceramics reached its maximum aesthetic development, with beautiful pieces.
Early Classical^{200–600}	Colima Phase	400	600	Gradual disappearance of the shaft tomb tradition and emergence of planned cities, with plazas and mounds. Fabrication of stone figures. Ceramics ceased to be refined and became more utilitarian.
Late Classical^{600–900}	Armería Phase	500	1000	From this period there is influence from Mesoamerica canons. Ceramics is geometric with simple and linear decoration.
Early Postclassical^{900–1200}	Chanal Phase	600	1500	Cities such as El Chanal appear, similar to the highlands, which integrate stone elements with gods representations. Ceramic figures become solid and metal artifacts are made.
Late Postclassical^{1200–1521}	Periquillos Phase	1000	1500	Three Lordships have military and commercial control: Aliman, Coliman and Cihuatlan-Tepetitango. Pottery is rough with more stylized traits and primitive appearance.
Source: Cano, Olga, Colima and its treasures, Arqueologia Mexicana.

The Capacha Culture includes nine sites identified in the eastern half of the state of Colima. Archaeological elements of this tradition have been discovered in the states of Nayarit, Jalisco, Sinaloa, Guerrero, Morelos, Michoacán and Mexico.

Among this sites are the following:

=== El Opeño ===
El Opeño is an archaeological site located in the municipality of Jacona, in the state of Michoacán. It is home to a prehispanic site, mainly known from the ceramic material found in the funerary complexes of the site, which have been dated to the late preclassical mesoamerican period. The importance of this site in mesoamerican archaeology is due to its antiquity and the ample diffusion of its style, contemporary to other native culture developments such as the Capacha culture and earlier of the Chupícuaro. El Opeño tombs are the oldest in Mesoamerica. Have been dated to around 1600 BCE, hence they predate de Olmec culture development, with main centers in the Gulf of Mexico coast and flourished some centuries later.

=== La Campana ===
La Campana is an archaeological site located a few kilometers from Capacha, it is included in the Mexican archaeological heritage list since 1917. Located in the vicinity of the city of Colima. This site was the largest prehispanic population center in western Mexico. Site studies indicate that some of its features are related to the classical period Teotihuacan culture.

=== Los Ortices Complex ===
Archaeologists assign a period between 300 BCE and 300 CE; located southwest of Colima, in the vicinity of the Los Ortices village. This native settlement was more evolved than the Capacha site, they produced finer pottery, also made stone sculpture and buried their dead in "shaft tombs", very characteristic of the region.

=== Armería & Colima Complex ===
Chronologically placed between 600 and 1100 CE, in an area east of the city of Colima, in the El Moralete neighborhood. This native group developed crafts with features somewhat more primitive than the others. Developed a smaller ceramics variety and built rougher shaft tombs.

=== El Chanal Complex ===
El Chanal site developed the most representative style of the region, settled in the El Chanal community. In the mid-20th century a step pyramid was found; at the beginning of the 1990s, discovered esplanades, temples, squares and a ballgame court: architectural evidence of a culture that had reached a high degree of evolution. By 1520, this complex had already disappeared and only remained in the area some native peoples, apparently subjected to another more powerful city, Tecomán.

== Important Aspects ==
This important site and its cultural development, enabled the generation of several important civilization aspects, among which are the following:

- Capacha Ceramic Tradition
- Shaft Tomb Tradition.
- Relationship evidence with South America.

=== Capacha Ceramic ===
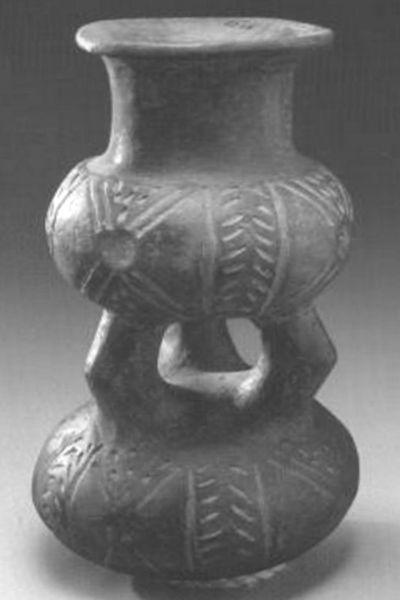
Capacha Culture Vessel.

Sample testing of ceramic specimens found in various sites in the state of Colima, San Blas, Ixtapa and Tomatlán (Jalisco) by Thermo-luminescence and carbon 14 have provided dates between 1320 and 220 BCE

Ceramic features

Capacha ceramic originality is based on two specific types:

- Large ceramic vessels, shaped as two globular stacked vases, one over the other. Named Bule.
- Ceramics that consists of two superimposed globular vessels, interconnected by two or three tubes. This ceramic shape resembles the South American “stirrup” handle ceramic tradition.

=== Shaft Tombs ===
Ceramic from Colima cultures, was primarily deposited as offering in shaft tombs.

Shaft Tombs and its offerings:

One of the most representative characteristics of the culture are the shaft tombs, funeral chambers with access through a shaft, hence its name.

Construction was normally made by digging on tepetate, with a depth varying depending on the soil hardness; sometimes with steps or a vertical circular duct, with a diameter of 1.20 to 1.40 m, used to reach one, two or three small chambers, resembling a baker's oven, where the offerings were placed next to the deceased.

Offerings could include ceramics with different motifs; men or women in some activity, and testimony of their kind of life (e.g. hunters, musicians, farmers with their belongings and clothing). Could also include items or ornaments of everyday use, or their Nahual. Their Nahual represented a trip mate to the underworld—the death God that guides the soul through the nine torrents that separate the deceased from heaven.

At the end of the funeral ceremony, the tombs were sealed with stone slabs or metates and the shaft filled with dirt. This type of burial chambers appeared during the Mid-Preclassical and the early classical; In addition to western Mexico, these are also found in Colombia.

The disappearance of this funerary tradition, established a change in deity worship, this probably led to the construction of ceremonial centers and plazas, as a result of the arrival of migrants from highlands groups. This is considered, because from the Armeria Phase (500-1000 CE) ceramics features changed and defensive constructions and representations of highland Gods, like Tláloc and Huehueteotl appeared. During the Chanal phase (600-1500 CE) cities such as El Chanal and La Campana were built, with plazas, platforms, and pyramids built with stones, a characteristic aspect of the area architecture.

=== South America ===
There are similarities between western Mexico and South America, including the building of shaft tombs in regions of both places. Recent studies have found common elements with countries as far away as Colombia, Ecuador and Peru, it is inferred that there was some type of contact perhaps by ocean navigation. Evidence was found in Treasure Beach (200-700 CE), on the Colima coast.

The nahual included in tombs, various animal shapes are very similar to those of the Mochica culture in Peru.

Others made links with the Machalilla culture in Ecuador.

According to Isabel Kelly, virtually all of Capacha's defining characteristics are also found in northern South American pottery assemblages.

== See also ==
- Colima Municipality
- State of Colima
- El Chanal
- El Opeño
- La Campana

== Bibliography ==
- Kelly, I. (1980). Ceramic Sequence in Colima: Capacha, an Early Phase. Tucson: University of Arizona Press (Anthropological Papers, 37).
- Ch. Duverger, La Méso-Amérique: L'art pré-hispanique du Mexique et de l'Amérique centrale, Flammarion, Paris, 1999. (in French)
- S. T. Evans, Ancient Mexico & Central America: Archaeology and culture history, Thames & Hudson, London, 2004.
- D. Lévine, Archéologie du Mexique. Les cultures préhispaniques de l'Ouest mexicain: L'État de Colima, Éditions Artcom', Paris, 1998. (in French)
- J. B. Mountjoy, Capacha: Una cultura enigmática del Occidente de México, en: Arqueología mexicana, volume 02, numéro: 09, México, 1994. (in Spanish)
- P. S. Schoenberg, La época prehispánica en Guerrero, in: Arqueología mexicana, volumen 14, número 94, México, 2006. (in Spanish)
- E. Taladoire & B. Faugère-Kalfon, Archéologie et art précolombiens: La Mésoamérique, École du Louvre, Réunion des Musées Nationaux, La Documentation Française, Paris, 1995. (in French)
