= Mesoamerican Preclassic period =

Historical period of Mesoamerica, 1200–400 BCE

Preclassic
- 2000 BCE – 250 CE
| Archaic | Classic |
- Location: Mesoamerica
- Including: Early; Middle; Late
- Key events: Ceramic development; fall of Cuicuilco; rise of Maya civilization; political development

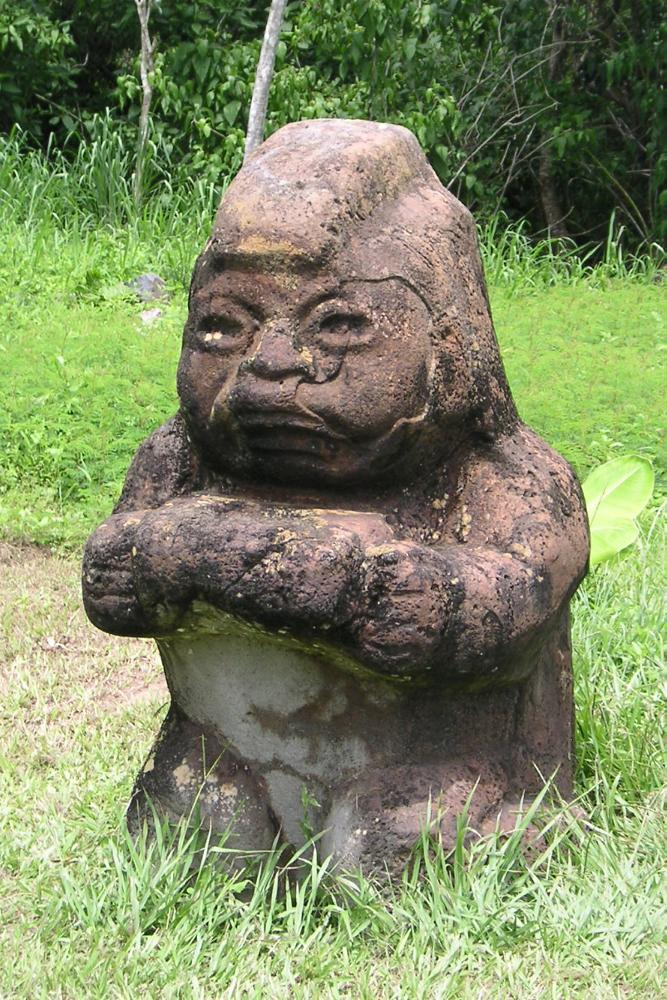
Olmec sculpture known as La abuela. It was found in La Venta, Tabasco, and moved to the state capital.

The Mesoamerican Preclassic period or Formative period began in about 2500 B. C. It dates from the probable date of the first Mesoamerican ceramics and lasted until around 200 A. D, the date of the fall of Cuicuilco, located south of Mexico City, where the circular pyramid built by this culture remains. Attributing its disappearance to the eruption of the volcano Xitle, located a few kilometers south of the pyramid. The eruption covered a radius of approximately 20 kilometers, in some cases up to 30 meters thick.

It indicates the moment in which the Maya civilization found their own distinctive culture which differentiated them from other Mesoamerican groups. These societies were sedentary agricultural villages, in which ceramics first occurred. On the Pacific coast, this period started around the year 1800 B. C., but in the rest of the Maya area it started between 1000 and 1200 B. C.

It was at the beginning of the Middle Preclassic period, around 800 B.C., when the first complex societies appeared in the Maya Area, in the form of chiefdoms.

== Early Preclassic ==
The early Preclassic is the cultural point that marks the transition between the Upper Cenolithic period and the start of Mesoamerican civilization and its development. Ceramics are an attribute that points to purely sedentary societies. In the case of Mesoamerica, it is estimated that the production of ceramics must have started between the twenty-sixth and twenty-fifth centuries B. C. The oldest evidence of ceramic manufacturing are the shards in Puerto Marqués, in the southern area of Guerrero. Archeologists have dated them to the year 2440 B. C.

The early stage of the Preclassic consists of the 1300 years from 2500 B. C. to 1200 B. C. In this era, Mesoamerican societies had become completely sedentary, as would be the case throughout the history of the region.

The absence of works of great size, characteristic of great states that would dominate later centuries, indicates that preclassical societies must have been somewhat egalitarian. This is not to say that all individuals were equal. These societies were organized based on kinship, sexual division of labor, and age.

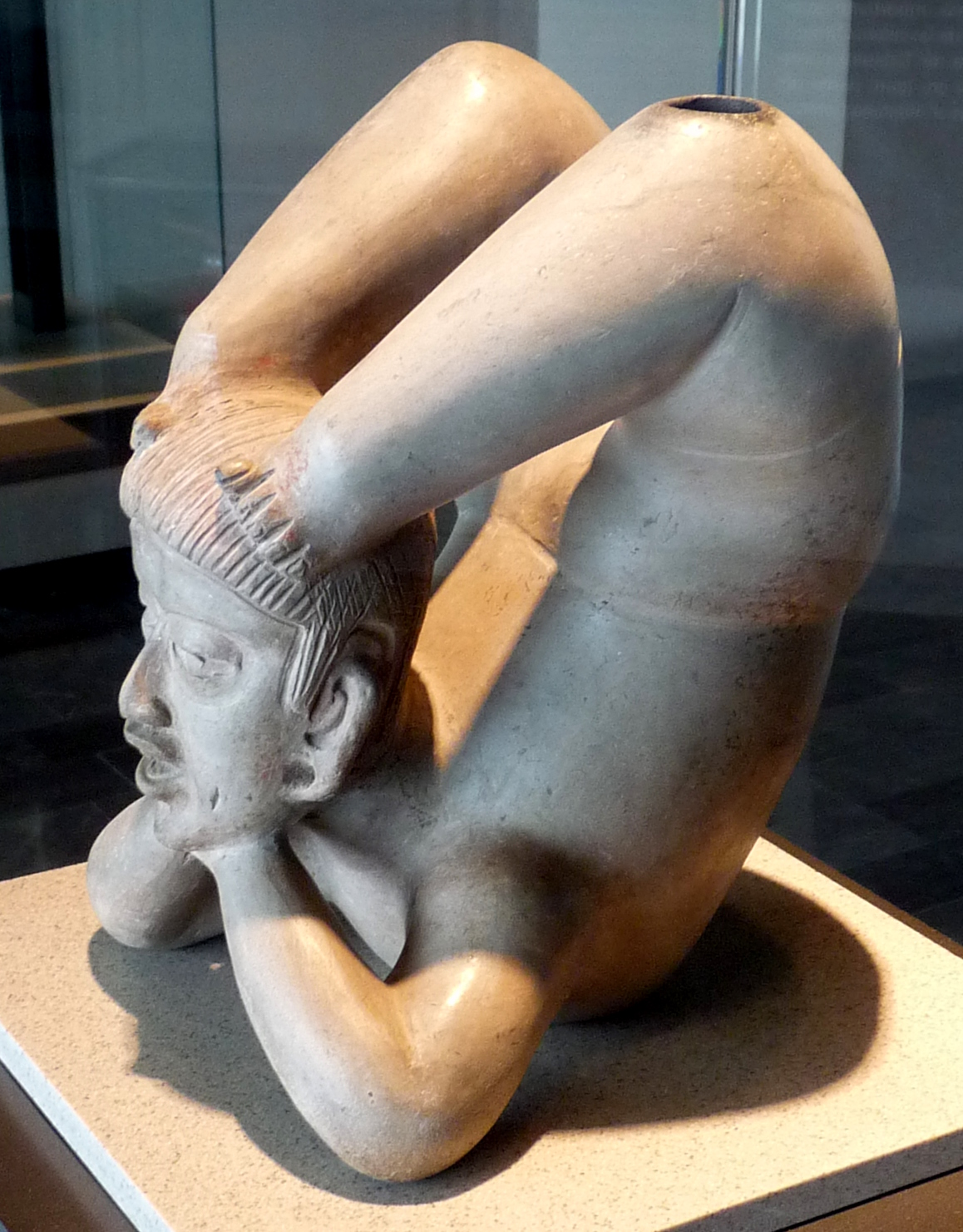
The Tlatilco Acrobat is an archaeological piece belonging to the Tlatilco culture. This site is famous for the large amount of pottery found in its tombs. The piece shows a clear Olmec influence.

Throughout the Early Preclassic, there is a process of cultural diversification. In the various regions that make up the area, different cultural traditions emerged that were dominant in the specialization of economic activities. However, no group could produce all the resources for their subsistence. For this reason, they formed trade routes, related to those pre-existing in the Upper Cenolithic, which allowed the societies involved in them to have access to resources from distant regions.

Trade took, since then, a central role in the formation of Mesoamerican civilization. Commerce was the vehicle that facilitated cultural exchange between Mesoamerican societies. In the early Preclassic, however, regional styles prevailed (at least as observed in archeological remains from this period), though it is possible to speak of an incipient civilizing process (as Darcy Ribeiro called it), which allowed all the cultures of the area to be based on maize agriculture, and had also laid the foundations of the Mesoamerican belief system, expressed in the cult of the elements.

During this period, the characteristic type of human settlement must have been a village. Some of these grew in population and became dominant, like El Opeño in the west; Tlatilco, Coapexco and Chalcatzingo in the center; and San José Mogote in Oaxaca.

=== San José Mogote, Oaxaca ===
A manifestation of monumental architecture in Mesoamerica is the ceremonial center of San José Mogote. It concerns a village located in the valley of Etla, one of the central valleys of Oaxaca. The village of Mogote (whose original name is unknown) was the most important of all settlements in the region, and had its peak at the end of the early Preclassic. Its decline is associated with the construction of Monte Albán, the classical capital of the Zapotecs, towards the end of the mid-Preclassic. Mogote was a farming village, which controlled the central region of Oaxaca (occupied until then by Zapotecs) and maintained relations with the OImec.

=== La Mixteca ===
La Mixteca is a region shared by the current states of Oaxaca, Puebla and Guerrero. It is a zone that presents evidence of ancient settlements. During the early Preclassic, the principal site of the region was Yucuita (from Mixtec yuku 'hill' and ita 'flower', together meaning 'hill of the flowers'), a town with a few hundred inhabitants, founded around 1400 B. C. The settlement consisted of a central stone platform, around which huts were constructed. Monte Negro was later established.

== Mid-Preclassic ==
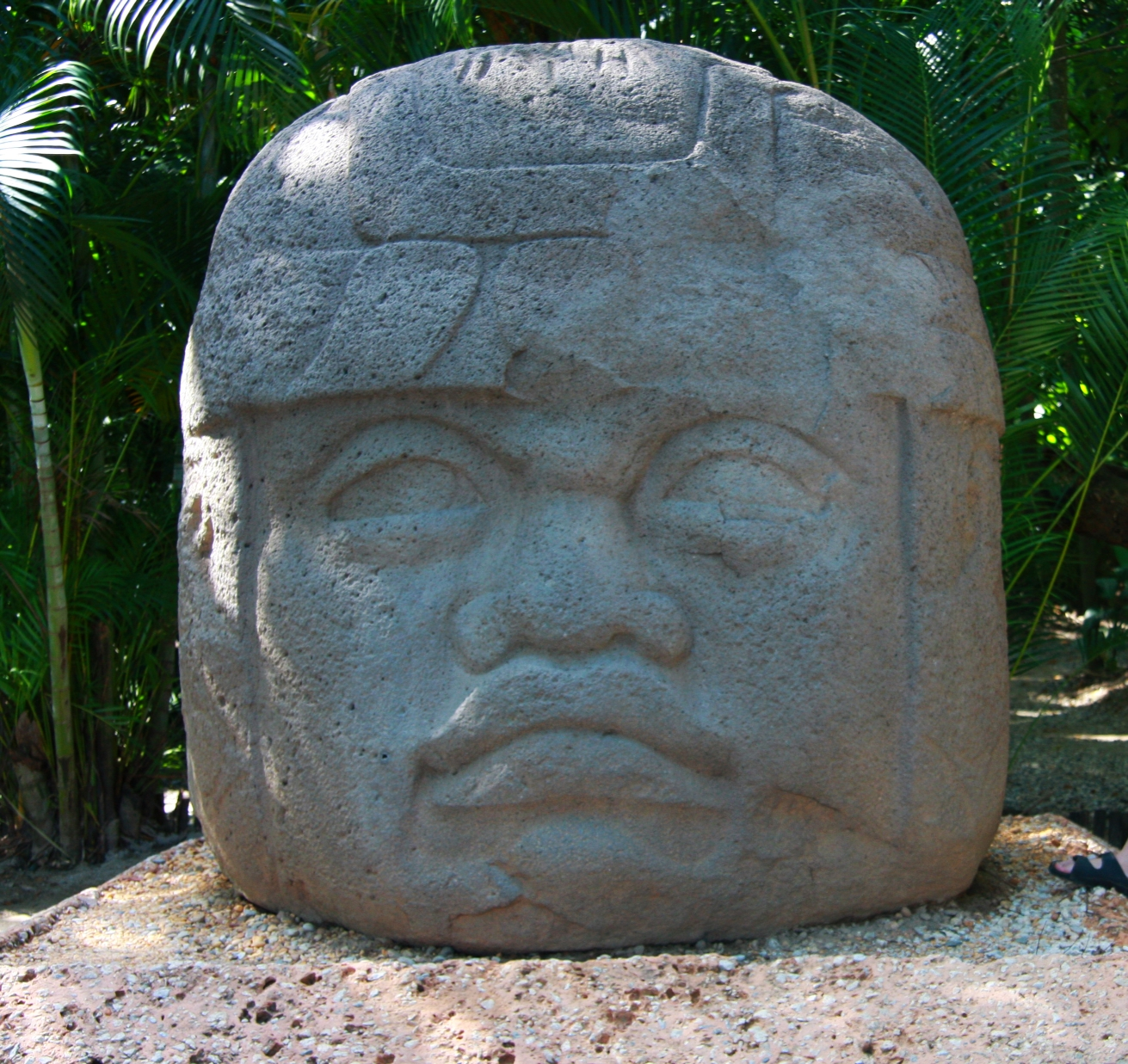
Monument 1 of La Venta. The Olmec culture is traditionally considered the mother culture. However, today archaeologists and anthropologists agree that the Mesoamerican civilization process was the product of a combined development of various societies, which converged in what is called Olmec culture.

The second part of the preclassic is termed the mid-Preclassic, and comprises the period between 1200 and 400 B. C. It was a period of intense technological changes, especially in respect to agriculture. In some regions, the first systems of irrigation and water control were constructed. In his book about Mesoamerican agriculture, Ángel Palerm considered that the movement of large amounts of workers for the construction of hydraulic systems is an indication of segmented society, with a strong centralized state.

=== Social transformation ===
In agreement with Palerm, López Austin and López Luján say that social stratification is one of the main characteristics of Middle Preclassic societies. Associated with these hydraulic systems, there appear ceremonial complexes of permanent monumental architecture. Irrigation systems first appeared in the valley of Tehuacán, Puebla, around 700 B.C.; a hundred years later, in the lake basin of Mexico; and around 400 B.C., in the central valleys of Oaxaca. Parallel to the technological modernization of agriculture, the cultivable species associated with this period increased in variation.

The mid-Preclassic was a period of specialization in productive processes. This phenomenon can be observed at the internal level of the different societies, however, more important is the regional specialization. The Mesoamerican peoples, as had been the case for a long time, had exploited the resources of their ecological niche, and had set up incipient exchange networks. But in the mid-Preclassic, the surpluses produced by agriculture allowed part of the population to engage in activities other than cultivation.

==== Social change ====
All this had certain repercussions on the social structure, that is, on the system of social relations. New groups appeared, such as artisans, and merchants became more important. In addition, as noted above, society as a whole became more stratified, and the ruling class (composed of the nobility and priests) became more clearly defined as a group separate from the common people. This can be seen from the remains found in the burials, the relative richness of the funerary offerings, the iconographic representations, and, above all, the appearance of sumptuary items of foreign origin.

In fact, in this era, it is possible to observe that the regional elites maintained relationships between themselves. The base of this was commercial, but there was also a military basis to this. Currently, the role of the military in preclassical societies is not neatly defined. However, monuments in Monte Albán show that, at the least, the Zapotecs, Maya, and Olmecs were expanding.

On the other hand, the urbanization process in which some Mesoamerican villages were immersed at the end of the Early Preclassic period, takes on its clearest characteristics in this phase. The villages become cities, which clearly repeat the segmentation of social life in the types of constructions (those of the elite tend to be more elaborate and durable than the popular dwellings). The Mesoamerican cities were built based on a conscientious plan, which turned the ceremonial centers of this stage into true astronomical observatories. The main axes are related to notable points of astronomical observation that allowed the priests to predict and keep track of the time. The cities of La Venta in Tabasco and San José Mogote in Oaxaca stand out as urban models of the time.

=== Calendar and writing ===
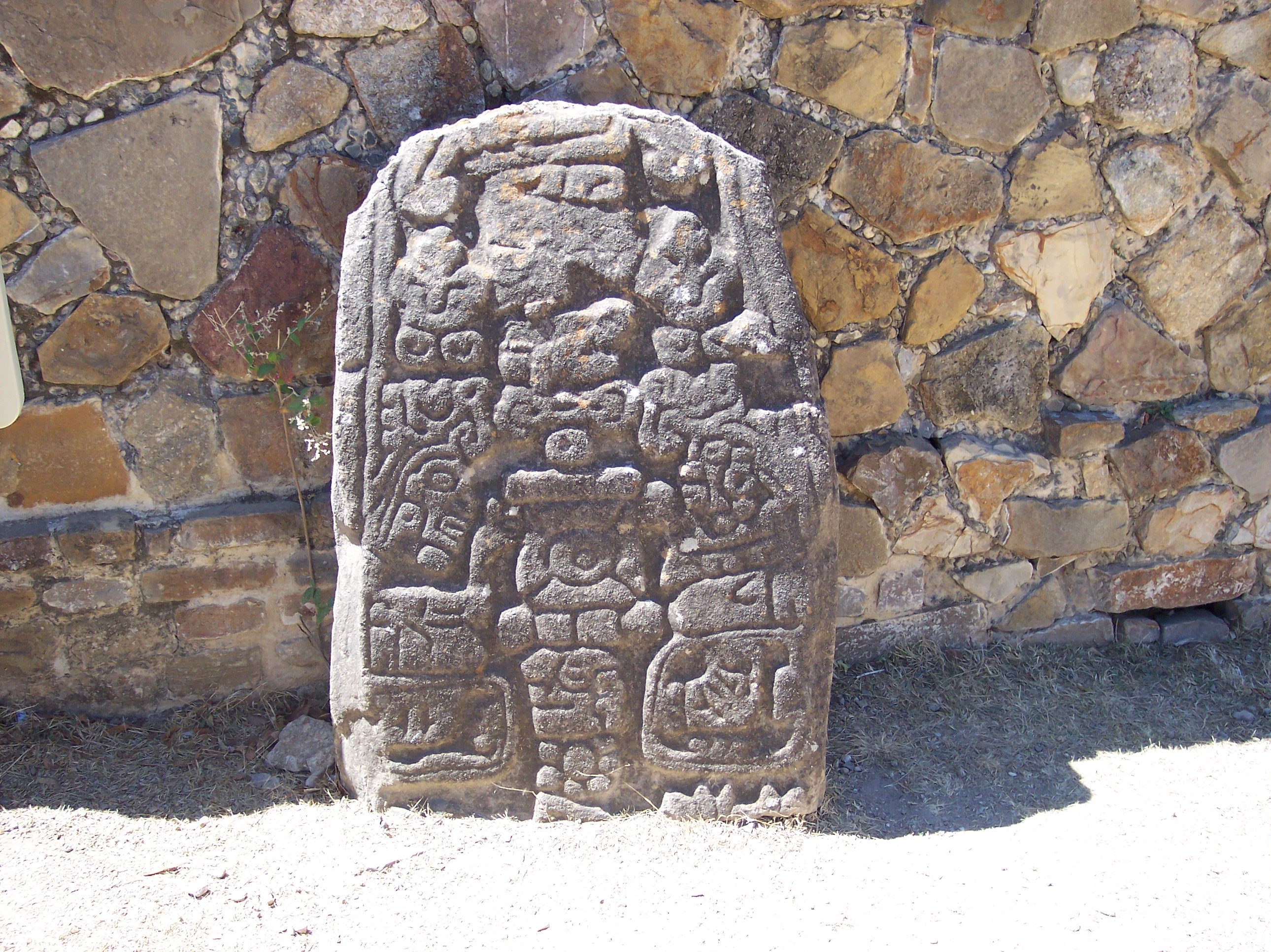
Tombstone clearly showing an example of Zapotec writing, the first to appear in the Mesoamerican area.

Related to the complex processes of social life and technology, writing and the calendar appeared in Mesoamerica. The first, from its beginnings, transmitted political information, and linked to it, chronological records are found. The oldest Mesoamerican writing systems correspond to the Mayan culture. The oldest inscriptions come from Monument 3 in San José Mogote, and from the tombstones of the Dancers Building in Monte Albán, as well as in Stelae 12 and 13 of the same site. They indicate events dated in the year 600 B.C. Some of these inscriptions are registered on the basis of the ritual calendar of 260 days; others contain chargers and signs of years, and possibly also already include nominative symbols of the scores in which the Mesoamericans divided the solar calendar of 365 days.

It used to be thought that Mesoamerican writing and the Mesoamerican calendar were cultural developments of the ancient Maya. However, it is now known that the Maya received it from the Olmecs, who in turn may have taken it from the Zapotecs. Even the famous Maya Long Count of time and its positional numbering based on twenty, first appeared among the Olmecs of the Gulf jungles.

== Late Preclassic ==
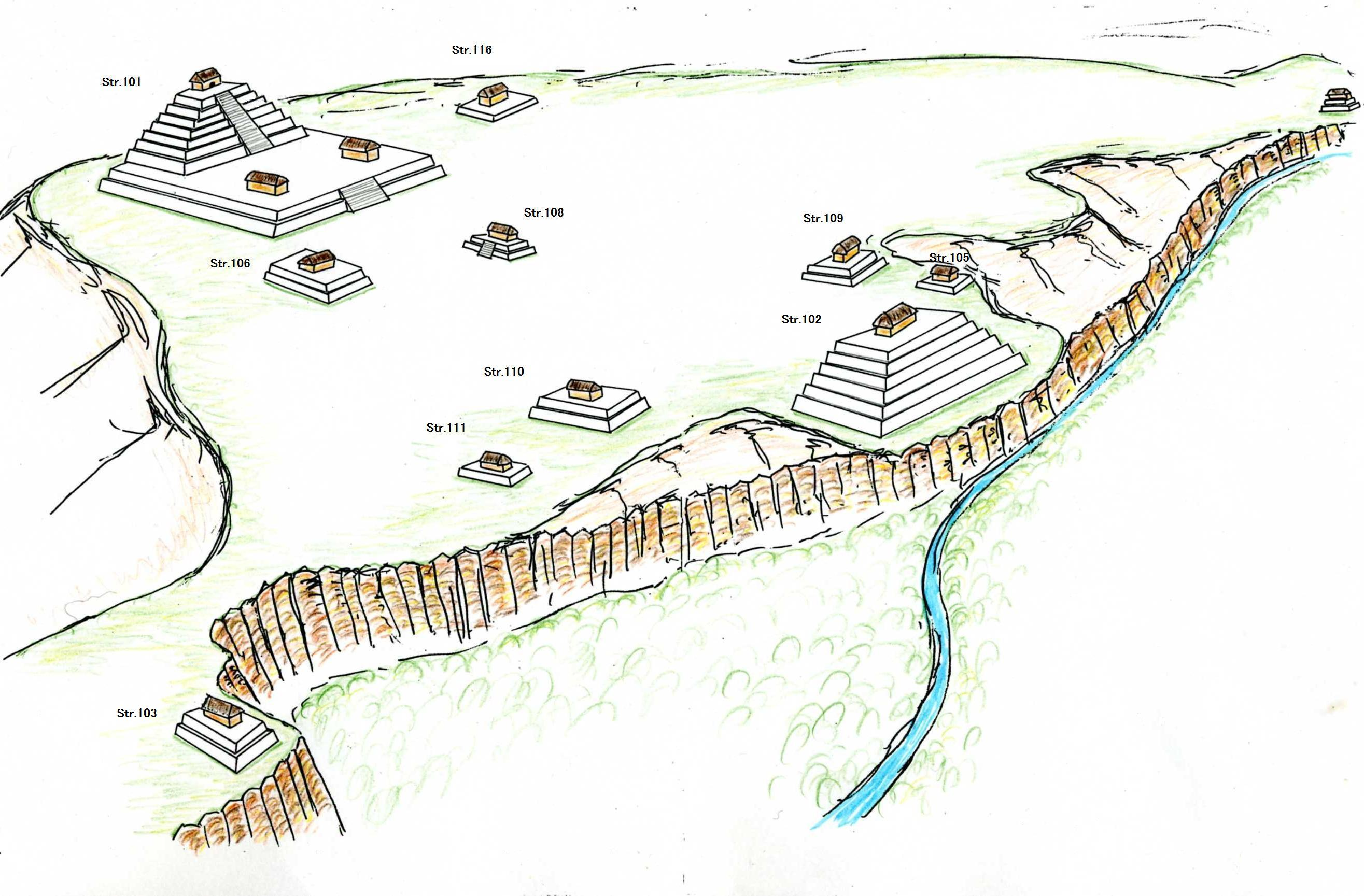
Structures of the Lenca archaeological site of Yarumela, Honduras. It reflects the influence of Olmec architecture in Central America.

The decline of the Olmec culture gave rise to the Late Preclassic period (400 B.C.-200 A.D.). This was a period of cultural diversification and assimilation of Olmec elements into the cultural systems of each people. On that basis, several of the most important traditions of Mesoamerica began. However, Cuicuilco, in the south of the Valley of Mexico, and Chupícuaro, in Michoacán, would be the most important. The first became the largest city in Mesoamerica and the main ceremonial center of the Valley of Mexico, and maintained relations with Chupícuaro. The decline of Cuicuilco is parallel to the emergence of Teotihuacan, and is consummated with the eruption of the Xitle volcano (circa 150 A.D.), which motivated the migration of its inhabitants to the north of the Valley of Mexico. The Chupícuaro culture is known above all for its pottery production, traces of which have been detected over a wide area located between the Bajío and the lake basin.

By the end of the Preclassic period, planning had begun for the cities that would become emblematic of Mesoamerica, such as Monte Albán and Teotihuacán.

== See also ==
Elsewhere

- Preclassic period in North America
- Preclassic period in Belize

Other

- Mesoamerican chronology
- Olmecs
- Cuicuilco
- Los Naranjos
- Teotihuacán
- Monte Albán
- Zapotec civilization

== Bibliography ==
- Ramírez, Felipe (1996). Temamatla: Una visión del horizonte Formativo desde la Cuenca de México. Bachelor's Thesis/National School of Anthropology and History/INAH-SEP/Mexico.
- Ramírez, Felipe, Lorena Gámez y Fernán González (2000). La cerámica de Temamatla. IIA-UNAM/México.
- Serra Puche, Mari Carmen y Felipe Ramírez (2001). «Temamatla, un sitio del horizonte formativo en el sureste de la Cuenca de México.» Revista Expresión Antropológica, No. 12/May–August/Mexican Cultural Center/Toluca, Edu. of Mex./Mexico.
