= El Pueblito, Catamarca =

Coordinates: 28.2881°S 67.1619°W

El Pueblito (Catamarca)
- Municipality and village
- Interactive map of El Pueblito (Catamarca)
- Country: Argentina
- Province: Catamarca Province
- Time zone: UTC−3 (ART)

El Pueblito (Catamarca) is a village and municipality in Catamarca Province in northwestern Argentina.
