= Corregidora Municipality =

Corregidora
- Municipality
- Coat of arms

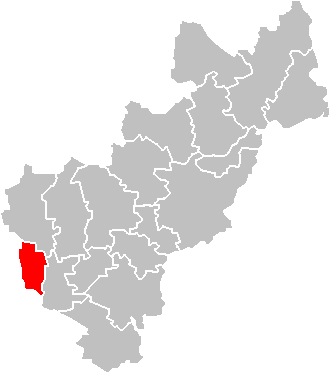
- Location of the municipality in Querétaro
- Coordinates: 20.531°N 100.442°W
- Country: Mexico
- State: Querétaro
- Municipal seat: El Pueblito

Area
  - Total: 245.8 km^{2} (94.9 sq mi)

Population (2010)
  - Total: 130,675
- Time zone: UTC-6 (CST)
- Website: corregidora.gob.mx

Corregidora is a Mexican municipality in the southwest of the state Querétaro, on the border with Guanajuato. Its municipal seat is the town of El Pueblito ("little town"), which had a population of 44,305 in the 2005 census.

It forms part of the metropolitan area of the state capital, Santiago de Querétaro. In area, it is the smallest of the 18 municipalities in Querétaro.

== History ==
The area was made a municipality in 1941 and named after Josefa Ortiz de Domínguez, known as La Corregidora, a heroine from the events leading to the Mexican War of Independence. Unofficially, the name Villa Corregidora had been in some use since the end of the 1920s.

== Population ==
According to CONAPO (National Population Council) by 2010 the municipality had a population of 130,675 inhabitants living in an area of 245.8 km^{2} (94.9 sq mi). Besides El Pueblito, other important urbanizations in the municipality are San José de los Olvera, Candiles, Tejeda and Venceremos.

== Economy ==
The economy in the city is based in part on agriculture, but mainly on the industrial sector, and most residents work in Santiago de Querétaro.

Corregidora is one of the richest municipalities in Mexico and Latin America. According to the United Nations, in 2004 the municipality had the fifth highest income level in the country, after three boroughs of Mexico City and the municipality of San Pedro Garza García, Monterrey. The same report placed it at the 12th highest level of human development among Mexican municipalities.

In the municipality there are several international and national companies, and few have their headquarters located there. An example of international companies, there is a factory of Siemens and the headquarters of Sika AG.

== Government ==
Executive: Presidente Municipal (Municipal President) or Alcalde (Mayor). The president serves for a period of three years without the possibility of reelection.

Current President: Mauricio Kuri of the PAN.

Delegations: Delegates are elected by the President and approved by the Cabildo. Each delegate works in a delegation, which is a section of the city.

Cabildo: The legislature, consisting of Sindicos and Regidores, and responsible for passage of local ordinances. They are elected by indirect vote.

== Local celebrations ==
- First 15 days of February: Day of the Virgin of El Pueblito.
- March 21 Spring Equinox in the pyramid of "El Cerrito".

== Landmarks ==
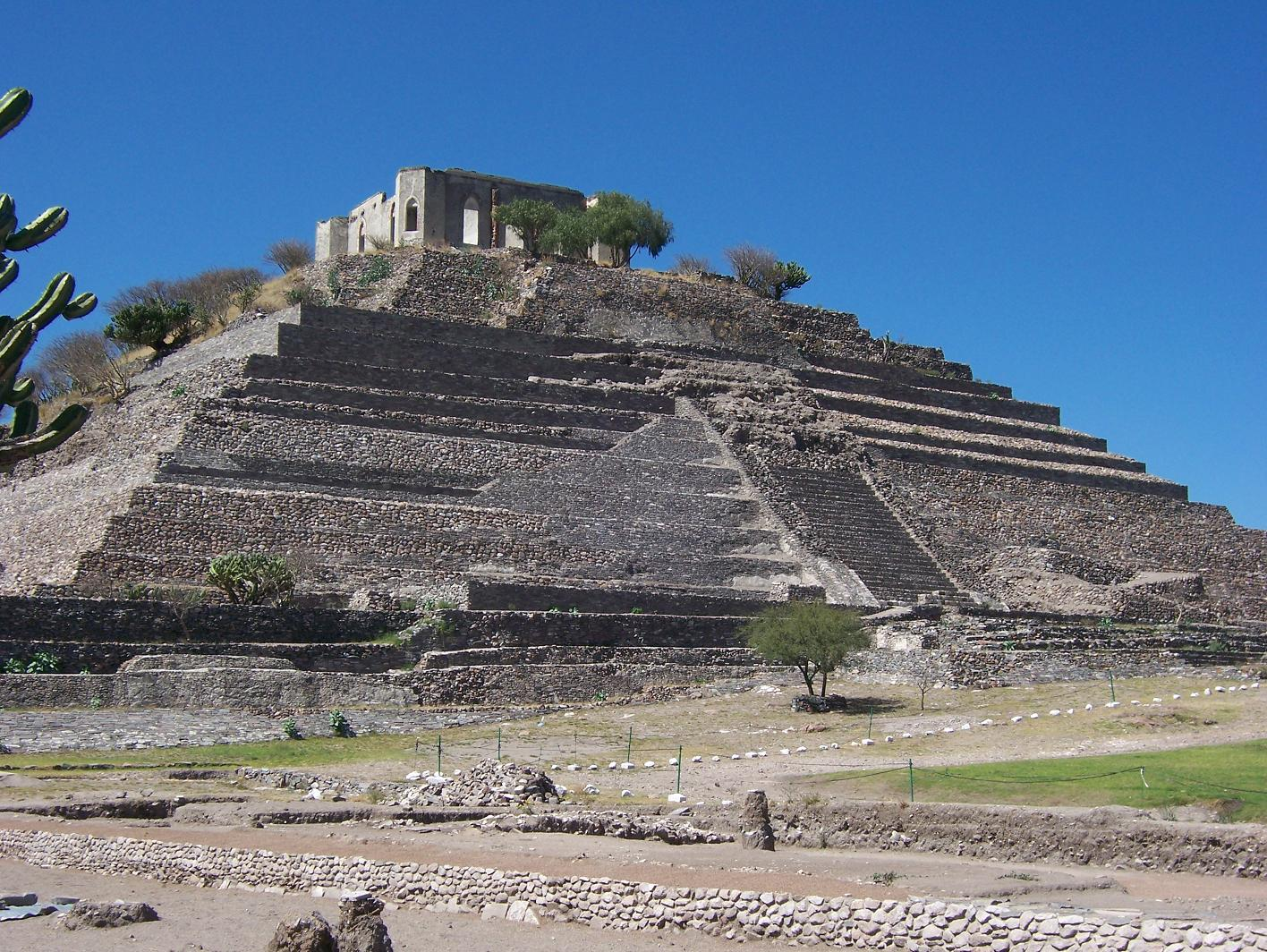
The pyramid of El Pueblito

The most important landmark is the Pyramid of El Pueblito.
