= El Pueblito, Querétaro =

El Pueblito
- City and municipal seat
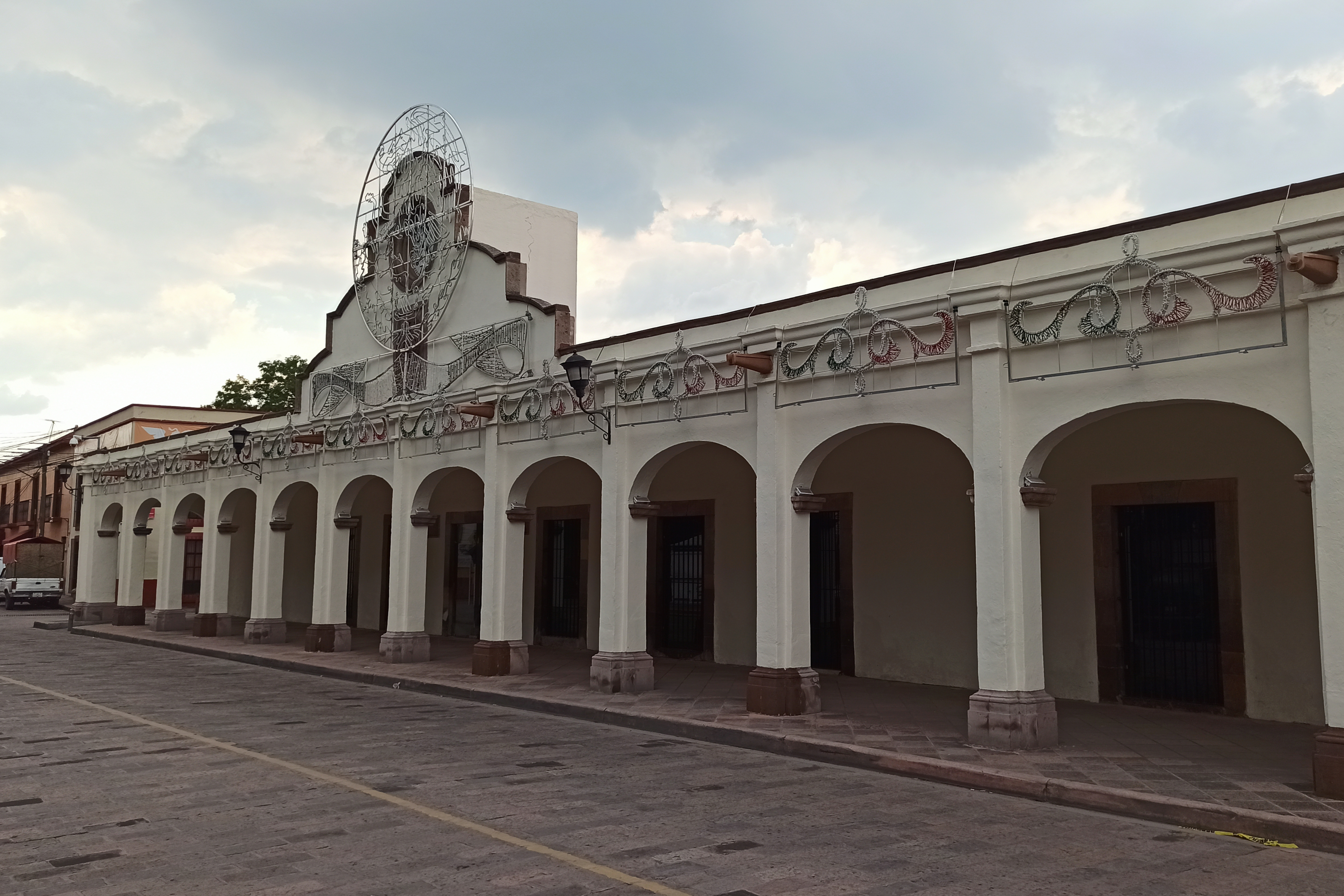

- Location in Mexico El Pueblito (Mexico)
- Coordinates: 20°32′23″N 100°26′29″W
- Country: Mexico
- State: Querétaro
- Municipality: Corregidora
- Elevation: 1,811 m (5,942 ft)

Population (2020)
  - Total: 115,264

El Pueblito is a city in the Mexican state of Querétaro. It serves as the municipal seat of the Corregidora Municipality. According to the 2020 population census conducted by INEGI, it had a total of 115,264 inhabitants. It is part of the Querétaro metropolitan area.

== Geography ==
The city of El Pueblito is located south of Querétaro City within the municipality of Corregidora; it is at an average height of 1811 meters above sea level. The entire municipality of Corregidora has a dry and semi-warm climate. El Pueblito has an average annual temperature of 18.6 °C and an average annual rainfall of 584.5 millimeters.

== Demographics ==
In the 2020 Mexican Census, El Pueblito recorded a population of 1,177 inhabitants of which 55,098 were men and 60,166 were women. It has a fertility rate of 1.54 children per woman. 50.24 percent of the population comes from outside the state of Querétaro. It has an average level of schooling of 13.38 years.
