= Chupícuaro =

Archeological site in Mexico

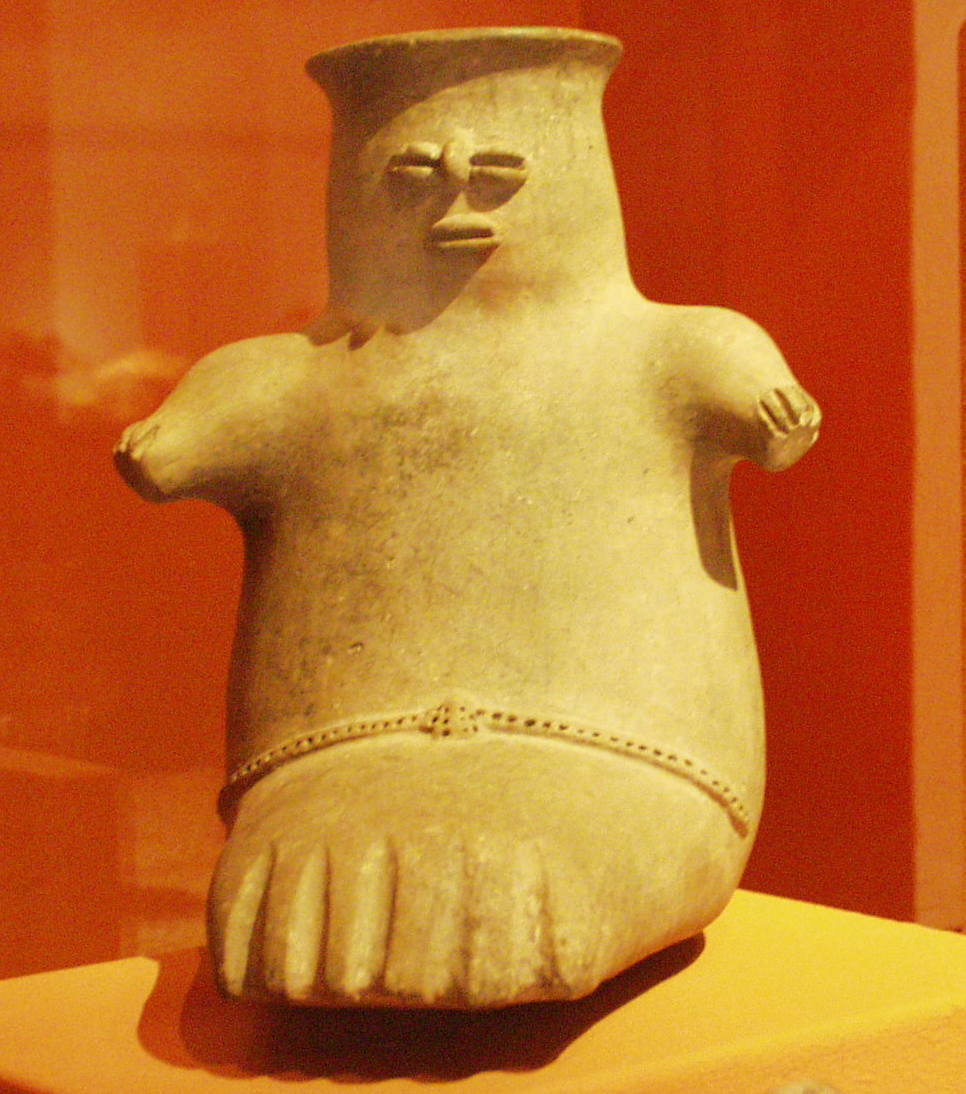
- Chupícuaro figurine, Michoacan
- Interactive map of Chupícuaro
- 20°01′20″N 100°35′29″W
- Periods: Preclassical Mesoamerican Period
- Cultures: Chichimec - Toltec
- Location: Nuevo Chupicuaro, Guanajuato; Mexico

Chupícuaro is an important prehispanic archeological site in what is now Guanajuato, Mexico, from the late preclassic period. The culture that takes its name from the site dates to 400 BC to 200 AD, or alternatively 500 BC to 300 AD, although some academics suggest an origin as early as 800 BC.

Although often included with the cultures of the Mexican West, Chupícuaro is both close to the Valley of Mexico and the northern edge of Meso-America. Information on the eponymous site, composed of several burial grounds, remains fragmentary, since most of it was flooded when the Presa Solis dam was built in the 1940s. An INAH excavation was able to salvage a little before that happened. Other excavations took place beginning in 1998, by the CEMCA, CNRS and l'INAH, and also contributed to knowledge of Chupicuaro culture.

On the northern border of Mesoamerica, west of the Mexican Plateau, just seven kilometers from Acámbaro, in Guanajuato State, México, it lies in hills near the Lerma River and its tributary the Coroneo or Tiger River.

== Etymology ==
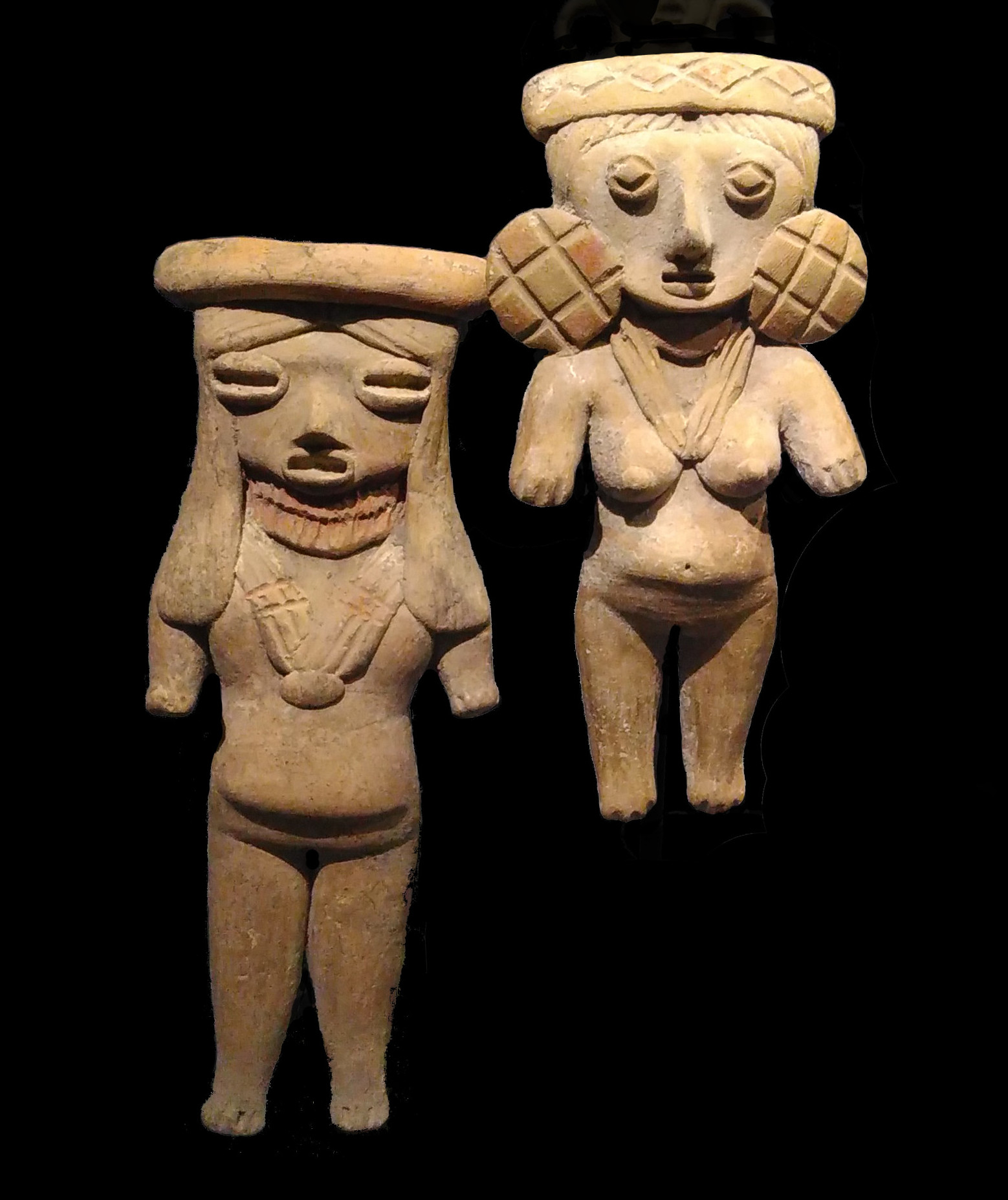
Female figurines found in Guanajuato, identified as pre-classic clay figures from the Chupicuaro culture, 400-100 BC. Sometimes called "Pretty Ladies."

The name Chupícuaro can be translated as blue place. The name derives from the Purépecha language word chupicua, a name for the Ipomoea plant, used for blue dye, and the term ro, place.

== History ==
This prehispanic archaeological site is located on the banks of the Lerma River, between the present-day cities of Acámbaro and Tarandacuao in the state of Guanajuato, Mexico. Little is known about the history of this site. The first explorations took place in 1946 and uncovered pottery objects and tombs. The site is currently below water because of the dam, although the surrounding area is still being explored.

Chichimeca nomadic groups (Guamares and Guachichil) arrived from the current San Luis Potosí state.

These groups settled in a large village of huts built over platforms coated with mud and stone. They grew corn, beans and squash on the banks of the Lerma River and its tributaries. Based on the existence of metals and stone molcajetes used to grind corn, they probably planted chili and tomatoes. It is also known they were hunters-fishers-gathers.

According to several authors, this settlement developed between 500 BCE and 300 CE. The first inhabitants of this area were hunter-gatherers who lived along the river and eventually developed agricultural knowledge.

In 2013 the level of the water behind the dam in Chupicuaro was lowered for a couple of days. Archeologists brought the towers from the old church to the town of Nuevo Chupicuaro in Guanajuato — the town founded in 1946 after the townspeople of the original town of Chupicuaro had to move out following the construction of the dam.

== Site ==
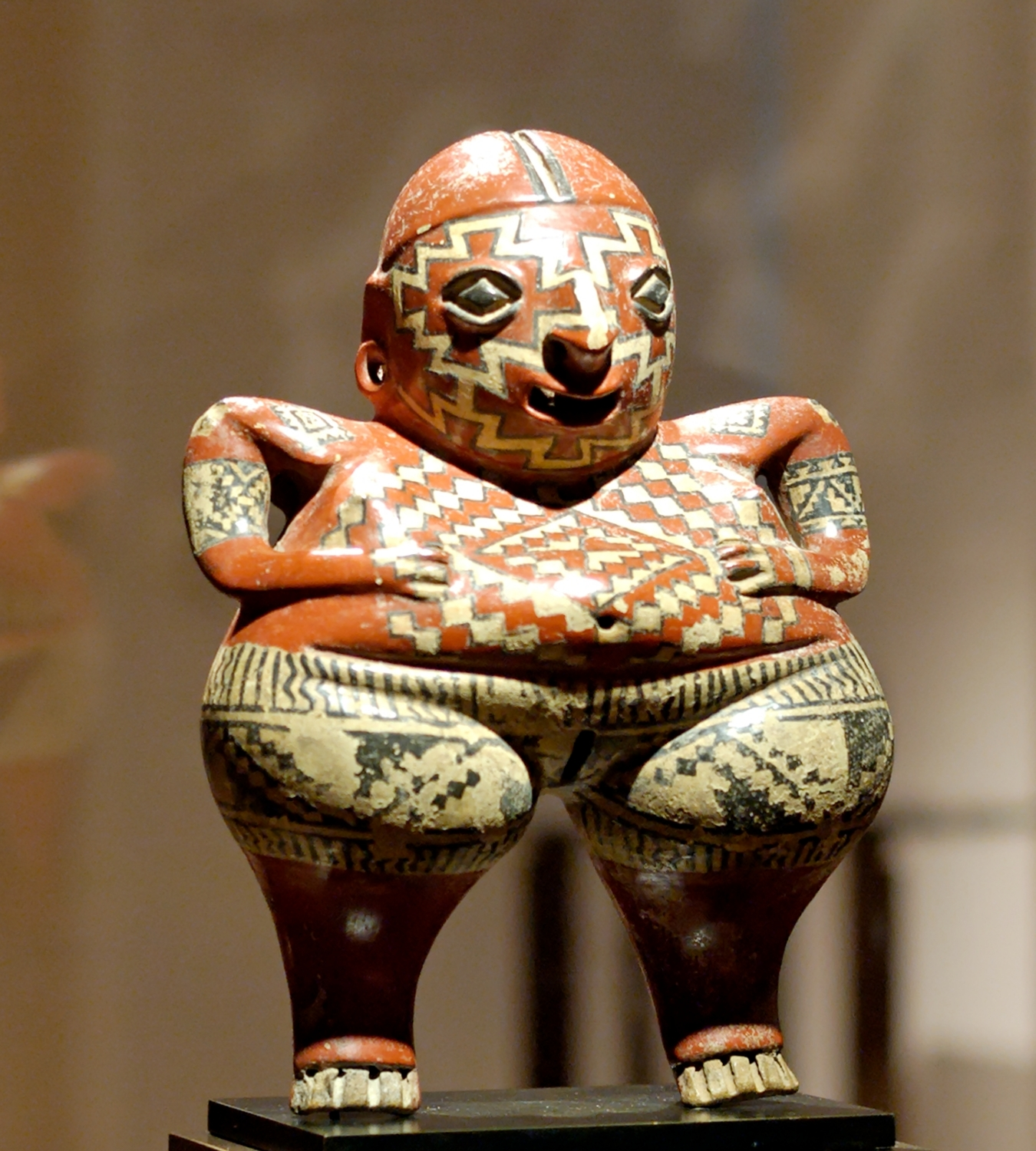
Chupicuaro statuette at the Louvre

From type evidence, its development has been established between 500 BCE and 300 CE, although some scientists suggest an older development, as far back as 800 BCE.

Ibarrilla, an unexcavated site in Leon, Guanajuato, is seen as part of the Chupicuaro complex. This archaeological site is potentially one of the most extensive and important of the country according to one author. There are thought to be more than a dozen pyramids built on an oval basement. Only one has been partially explored; various flint stone objects, figurines and pottery were found.

The rest of the structures remain to be explored. There are tombs, altars and other scattered remains in an estimated 500 m2 area.

== Chupícuaro culture ==
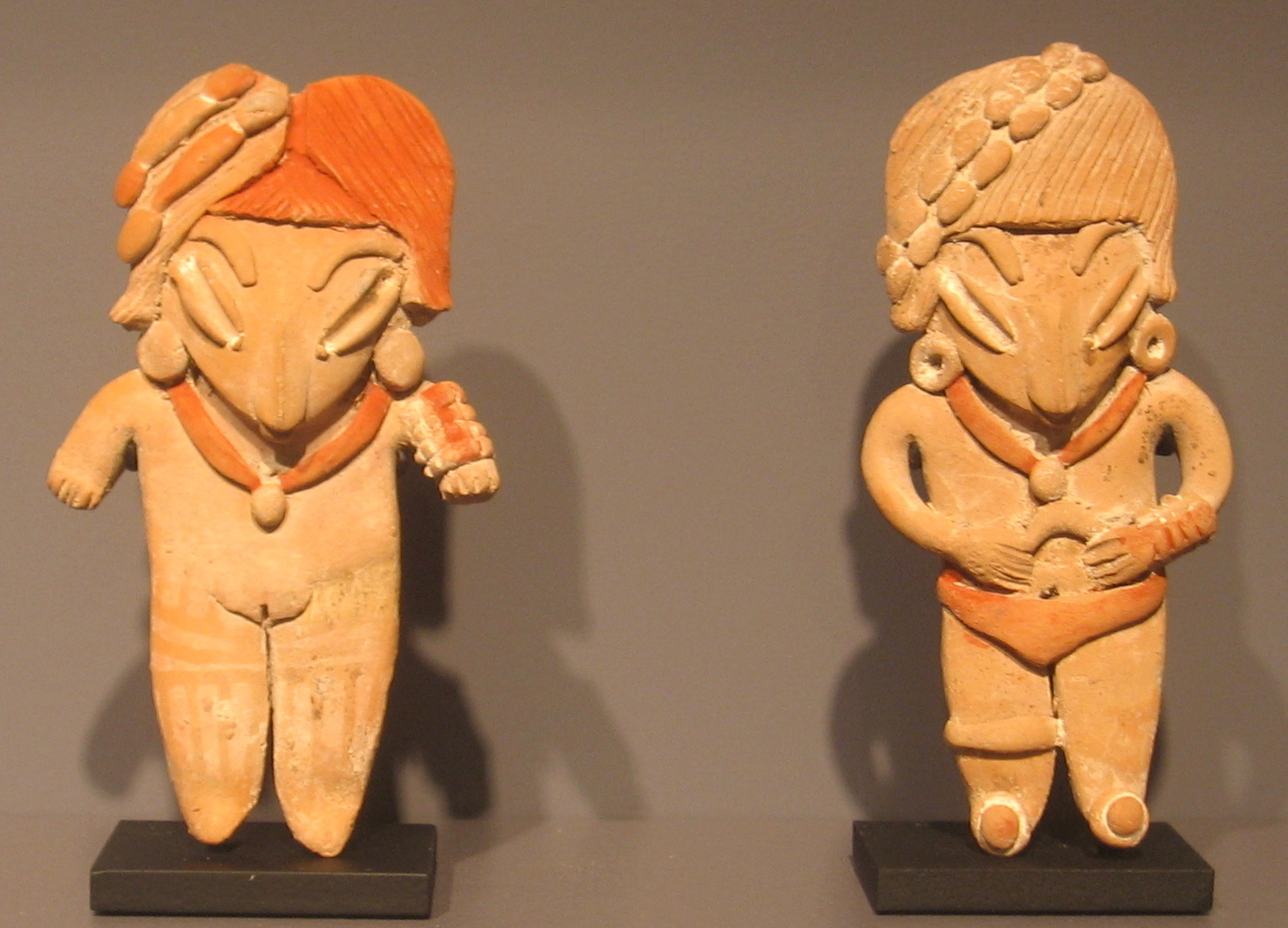
Two Chupicuaro culture figurines, 500-0 BC

This culture is important due to its influence in the area. It may have spread to what is now the southern United States, circa 500 BCE. There are theories that the first inhabitants of Guanajuato belonged to this culture.

Ceramics of this culture pre-date the classical Mesoamerican period, and include angular figurines with geometric shapes. The Acámbaro museum exhibits pieces from the Purépecha, Mazahua, and Otomi cultures.

Apparently the Chupícuaro culture developed in a vast territory, or it was defined as Chupícuaro style or tradition, in Guanajuato, Michoacán, Guerrero, Mexico State, Hidalgo, Colima, Nayarit, Querétaro and Zacatecas. It is estimated that Chupícuaro facilitated the northward expansion of Mesoamerican elements (cultural roots of western Mexico and perhaps Northwest, comparable with the Olmec culture throughout Mesoamerica.)

Chupícuaro had an important cultural development and expansion of its style in distant areas from the diffusing center and influenced ceramic traditions, which lasted until the end of the classical period, and even into the Postclassical, as seen in Purépecha Michoacán ceramic.

At the end of 1985, at the first prehispanic societies meeting in relation to the Chupícuaro culture, it was noted, that Chupícuaro tradition ceramics manufacturing groups, should be considered part of Mesoamerican stratified societies, with a definite political and territorial structure, rather than as isolated village societies, lacking ceremonial centers and architecture. From that first impulse, subsequent social groups presented their own cultural expressions at a regional level in the Mesoamerican context.

== Regional cultures ==
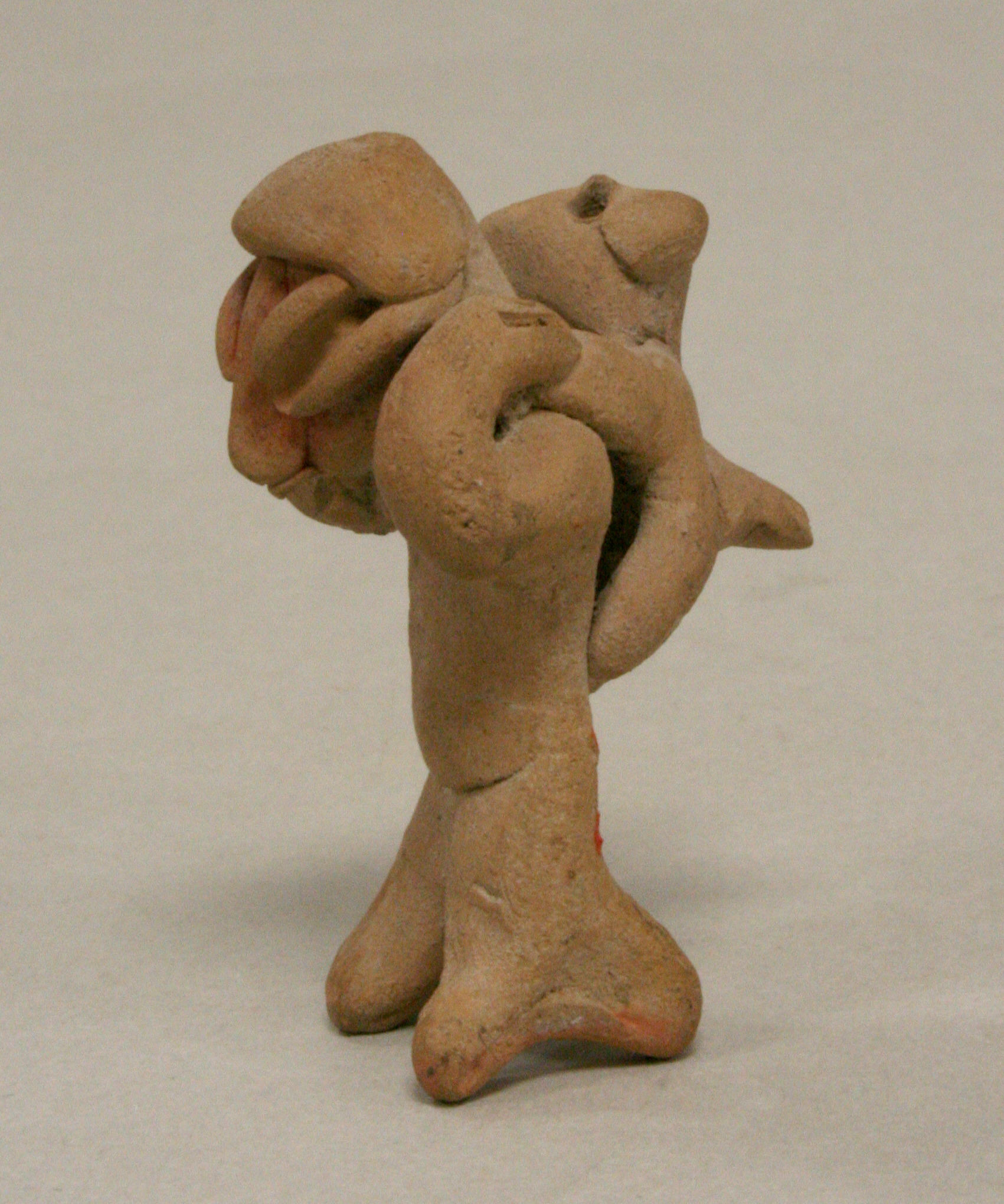
Figure with Animal(?) on back, 3rd century B.C.–A.D. 4th century.

The Acámbaro region had five Prehispanic cultures:

- Chupícuaro – Late Preclassical - 800 BCE to 200 CE.
- Los Morales - Late Preclassical - 400 BCE to 250 CE.
- Teotihuacán - Classical Period - 200 CE to 900 CE.
- Toltec – Early Postclassical - 900 CE to 1200 CE.
- Purépecha – Late Postclassical - 1200 CE to 1525 CE.

Source: Archaeology Hall, Acámbaro Local Museum, Guanajuato, 2001.

== Late Preclassical (Formative) period ==
The decline of Olmec culture at the beginning of the Late Preclassical period (400 BCE - 150 CE) marked a period of cultural diversification and assimilation of Olmec elements into cultural systems that was the origin of several of the most important Mesoamerican traditions. However, Cuicuilco in the south of the Valley of Mexico, and the Chupícuaro, are the most important. The first became the largest city in Mesoamerica and the main ceremonial center of the Valley of Mexico; it maintained relations with Chupícuaro. The decline of Cuicuilco paralleled the emergence of Teotihuacán, and consumed with the eruption of the Xitle volcano circa 150 CE, which led to migration north from the Valley of Mexico. Chupícuaro culture is known for its ceramics, of which remnants have been found in a wide area located in the Bajío and the lake basin.

== Trade and trade routes ==
The Acambaro Valley, located near the Lerma river, served as a vital passageway connecting western and central Mexico, as well as the Chupicuaro culture. The San Juan del Río region was also significant as a trade route for the Chupicuaro people, and later during the Teotihuacan era. The region's trade was sustained by a complex network of roads, which followed the ancient pathways first built by the Chupicuaro communities during the Late Preclassic period.

== Ceramics ==
Chupícuaro was a major ceramic center, recognized as one of the best in Mesoamerica for the fine ceramic finishing and decoration, which were developed in multiple shapes and colors, some with geometrical drawings. The motifs were deities, maternity, breastfeeding, people and their ornaments, animals and plants.

Ceramics included multiple monochromatic forms and a variety of three-color polychrome (red, beige and black) with pyramidal geometrical drawings or zig-zags. Clay figurines used "pastillaje" techniques and made hollow figures. Shell, bone and stone were used.

From a study of ceramic styles, the clothing used is inferred, they painted their faces and bodies, wore sandals, truss, necklaces, earflaps, and earrings. Women wore elaborate hairstyles.

The clay figurines were crafted using ancient techniques, such as appliqué, incising, and punctation. Elaborate appliqué was used to create the figurines' distinct features, including their large noses, eyes made with small strips or punctations, and small slit mouths. The figurines were often depicted with minimal clothing, most showing genitals, with female features often being exaggerated. The most variable features of the figurines were their jewelry and headdress arrangements. They were painted with red and white pigments, applied by brushing or sprinkling the pigment onto the figurine's cracks and grooves. These figurines were possibly created to serve as companions to the deceased or effigies of their family members.

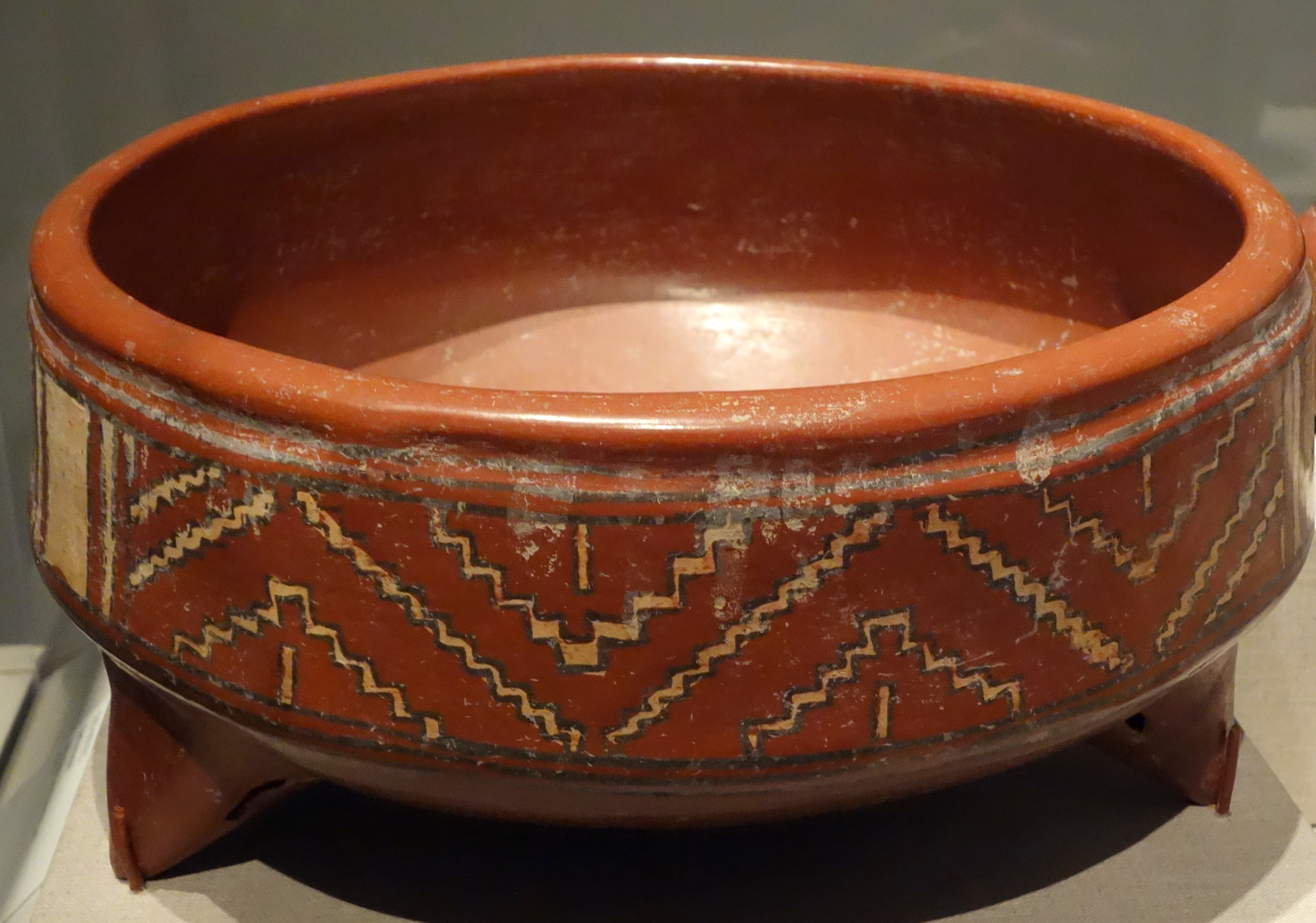
Tripod bowl, Mexico, Chupicuaro, 300 BC to 1 AD

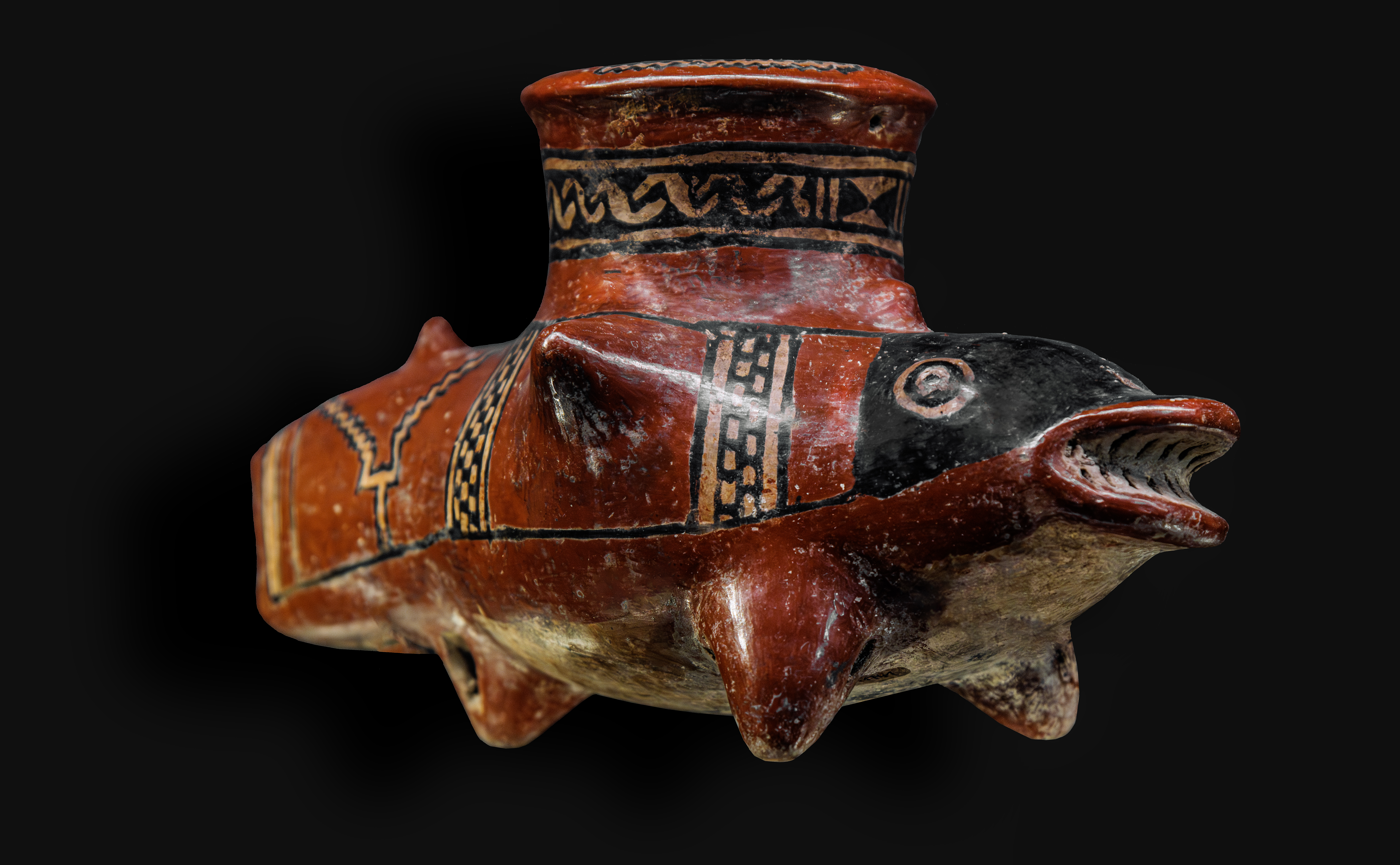
'Vase with a neck depicting a cetacean' Musée des Amériques

== Maya blue ==
Maya blue is a blue/indigo pigment resulting from an addition reaction between indigo and clay, which was widely used in pre-Columbian Mesoamerica. The pigment's origins were first identified in Calakmul, a pre-Columbian city in Mexico, dating the use of the pigment back to around 150 CE in the Late Pre-Classic Period. However, a 2019 study by Vazquez De Agregados-Pascual et al. discovered the use of Maya-blue pigment to be at least 250 BCE through the analysis of funerary artifacts found in a 2001 excavation at La Tronera, located on the east side of the Acambaro Valley in West Mexico.

The study identified the use of the blue pigment on pottery found at the site, as well as the use of the red pigment cinnabar, in a funerary context. The presence of these pigments was identified through the use of LC_MS/MS-TOF-MS and Raman spectroscopy.

This analysis of the pigments used in the funerary artifacts places the origin of Maya-blue in an older temporality and in a non-Mayan Pre-Hispanic culture, showing that the people of the Chupicuaro culture had already mastered the technology and the know-how needed to manufacture this blue pigment by the end of the Middle Pre-Classic Period.

== Burials ==
Chupícuaro inhabitants practiced a cult of the dead characterized by tombs where they placed trophy skulls, obsidian arrowheads, metates, figurines, earflaps, shell ornaments, necklaces and beads, bone artifacts and musical instruments. These were all found during excavations around 1950.

The many burials and offerings provide knowledge of the way of life of the ancient Chupícuaro inhabitants. They were farmers who lived in huts built from perishable materials forming a good extended rural village, built low platforms with clay floors, sometimes grouped together, over which their houses were built. They harvested corn, beans and pumpkin.

== Bibliography ==
- Ofrendas Funerarias de Chupícuaro Guanajuato. Dolores Flores. INAH. 1992. (Spanish)
- Estudios Arqueológicos en el Río de la Laja, Guanajuato. Beatriz Braniff de Torres. INAH. 1975. (Spanish)
- Síntesis de la Historia Pre-tolteca de Meso América. Wigberto Jiménez Moreno. CIAM. 1959. (Spanish)
- Una visión del México Prehispánico. Román Piña Chán. UNAM. 1967. (Spanish)
- La arqueología en Guanajuato. Crespo, Ana María. INAH. 1988. (Spanish)
