= Isabel Kelly =

American anthropologist (1906–1983)

Isabel Truesdell Kelly
- Isabel T. Kelly ethnographic archive, circa 1926-1980, DeGolyer Library, Southern Methodist University.
- Born: January 4, 1906; Santa Cruz, California

Isabel Truesdell Kelly (1906–1983) was an American anthropologist known for her work with the members of the Coast Miwok tribe, members of the Chemehuevi people in the 1920s and 1930s, and her work later in life as an archaeologist working in Sinaloa, Mexico. She was trained by anthropologist Alfred L. Kroeber at the University of California, Berkeley.

== Education and career ==
Kelly attended the University of California, Berkeley and earned her BA in 1926, her MA in 1927, and her PhD in 1932, all in anthropology.

Kelly was awarded Guggenheim Fellowships for the academic years 1940–1941 and 1941–1942. In 1946 she was appointed Ethnologist-in-Charge of the Mexico city office of the Smithsonian Institution's Institute of Social Anthropology (ISA). She taught at the ISA and, with the assistance of students, did research among the Totonac in the Mexico state of Veracruz. The ISA was started in 1943 and disbanded at the end of 1952 — at that time Kelly and the ISA's other remaining anthropologists were transferred to the Institute of Inter-American affairs.

Her papers are on file today in the DeGolyer Library at Southern Methodist University.

== Publications ==
Most widely held works by Kelly:

- The carver's art of the Indians of northwestern California, 1930
- Ethnography of the Surprise Valley Paiute, 1932
- Excavations at Culiacán, Sinaloa , 1945
- The archaeology of the Autlán-Tuxcacuesco area of Jalisco, 1945
- Excavations at Apatzingan, Michoacan, 1947
- The Tajin Totonac, 1952
- Folk practices in north Mexico; birth customs, folk medicine, and spiritualism in the Laguna Zone, 1965
- The Hodges Ruin : a Hohokam community in the Tucson Basin, 1978
- Ceramic sequence in Colima : Capacha, an early phase, 1980
- Isabel T. Kelly's Southern Paiute Ethnographic Field Notes, 1932-1934, Las Vegas, 2016
