= Ixtlán del Rio (archaeological site) =

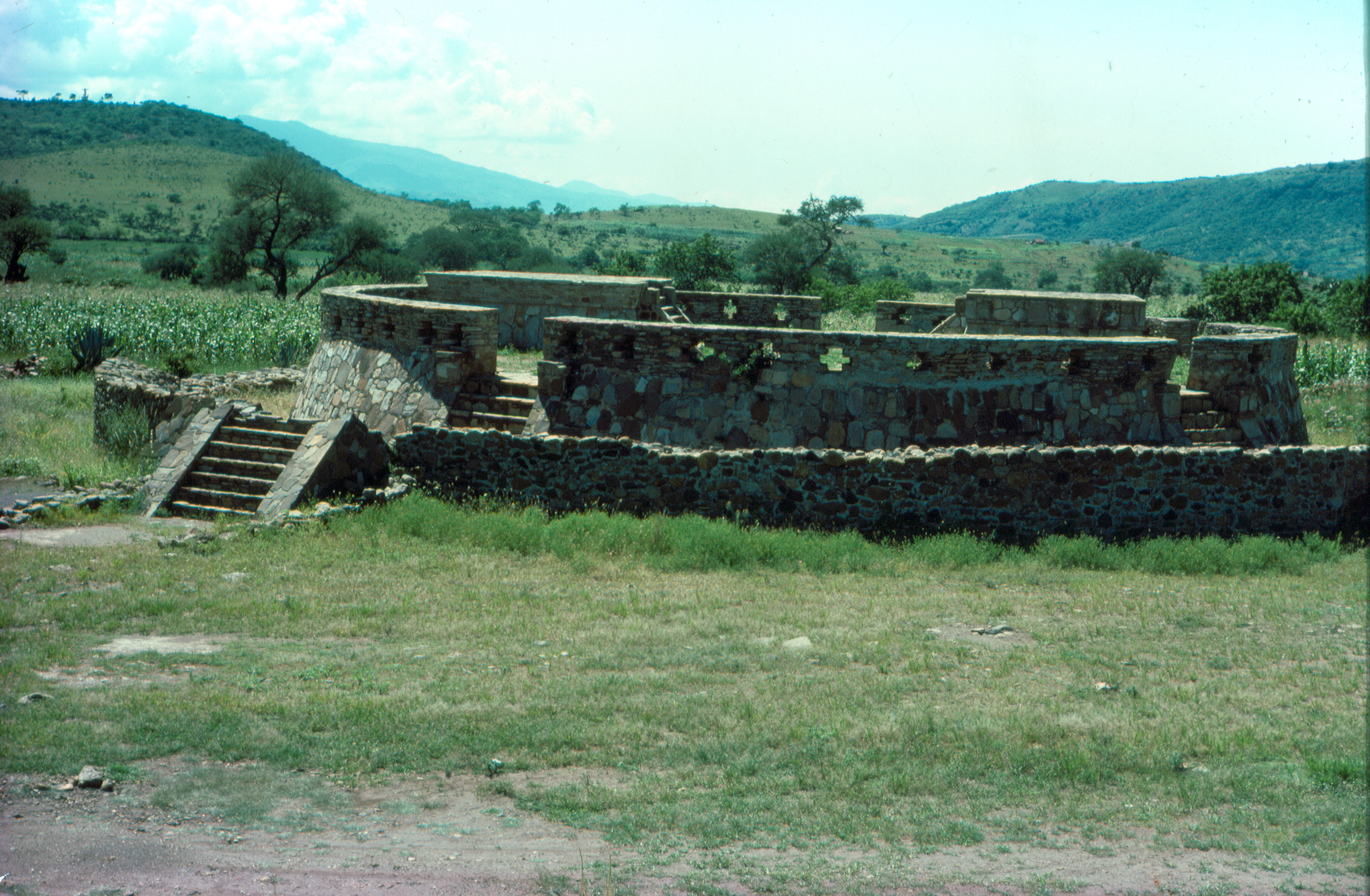
- Ixtlán del Rio round structure
- Interactive map of Ixtlán del Rio
- 21°02′23″N 104°20′41″W
- Associated with: Aztatlán Tradition - Nahua
- Location: Ixtlán del Rio, Nayarit
- Region: Mexico

Ixtlán del Rio is an archaeological site located in the Ixtlán del Rio municipality, on the south west region of the Mexican state of Nayarit. It is also known as "Los Toriles" and contains the only vestiges of the western cultures in Nayarit.

The presence of prehispanic vestiges in the form of petroglyphs are registered in five areas, the most important are "El Terrero", "Sayulapa" and "El Veladero", which depict sgraffiti lines and representations of abstract figures, such as spirals with rays.

Of the traditional shaft tombs, five large concentration areas have been identified, containing human bone remains; domestic pottery ollas, comales and cantaros (pitchers)]; as well as sculpture type remains (human and animal figures).

== Background ==
In remote times in which Paleo-Indians crossed the Bering Strait, several sedentary groups migrated south. The territory of present-day Nayarit state has manifestations of those settlers, chronologically and consecutively located in three cultural periods: Los Concheros, the shaft tomb tradition and the Aztatlán tradition.

=== Los Concheros ===
Los concheros ("concha" = shell), is a name given to groups dedicated to the sea exploitation of the ocean shores, and in the process developed the first settlements, with sea shells. According to archaeologist Gabriela Zepeda, the Matanchén and San Blas coves, it was in the Nayarit shores where history commenced in these lands. From about 2000 BCE up to 1500 CE, an amazing occupation persisted by a culture that perceived the sea as merciful and stormy God. It was also the origin of artistic ceramic modeling and cooking.

=== Shaft Tomb Tradition ===
Western Mexico archaeological sites. The orange circles show archeological sites. The larger green circles highlight the most important sites. Note that the sites form what has been called the "shaft tomb arc" which extends from northwest Nayarit through the central Jalisco highlands and down to Colima.

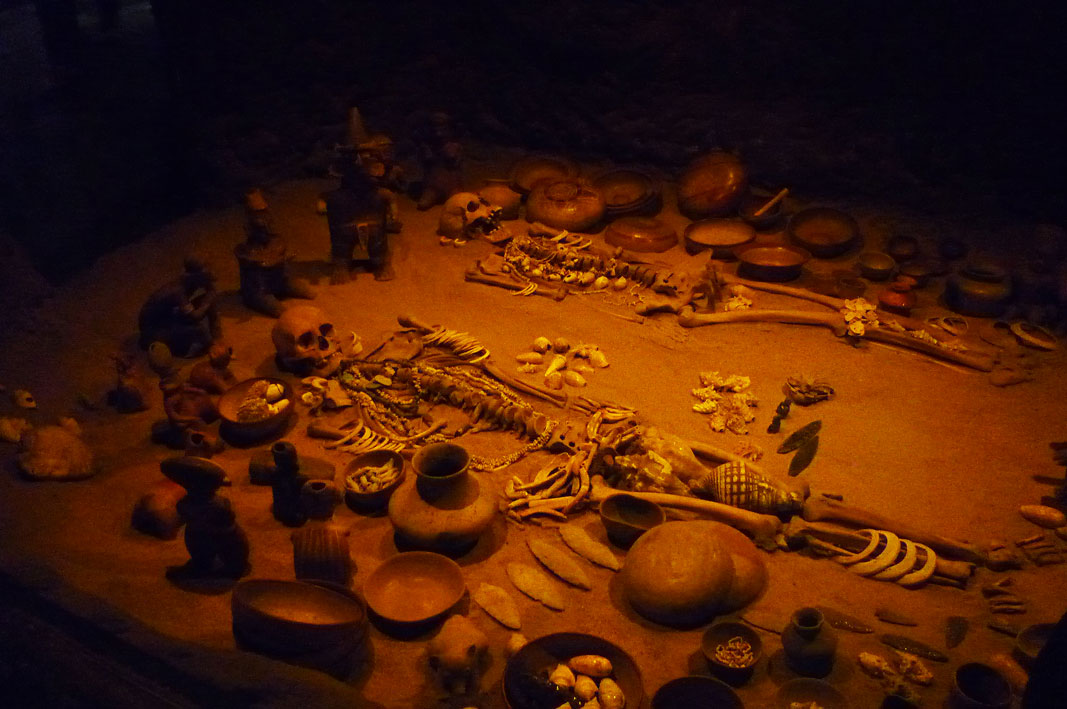
Reconstruction of an excavated Shaft tomb exhibited at the Museo Nacional de Antropologia e Historia, México.

On the traditional shaft tomb tradition, five major areas of concentration were identified, containing bones; ceramics for domestic use (pots, comales and pitchers); and remains of sculptural type (human and animal figures).

The shaft tomb tradition (500 BCE-500 CE) constitutes a peculiar feature of prehispanic Mesoamerican development, although there are analog burials forms elsewhere in the continent. Shaft Tombs thus far discovered in the territory of Nayarit, were found and excavated outside of the settlement sites of that epoch, in vertical shafts (wells), with one or two chambers where their dead were placed together with human and animal sculptures, also with large vessels that contained funerary offerings, these reflect the development achieved by this tradition, with the particular regional characteristics found.

The Western Mexico shaft tomb tradition or shaft tomb culture refers to a set of interlocked cultural traits found in the western Mexican states of Jalisco, Nayarit, and, to a lesser extent, Colima to the south, roughly dating to the period between 300 BCE and 400 CE, although there are disagreements on this end-date. Nearly all of the artifacts associated with this shaft tomb tradition have been discovered by looters and are without provenance, making dating problematic. The first major undisturbed shaft tomb associated with the tradition was not discovered but until 1993, at Huitzilapa, Jalisco.

The shaft tomb tradition is thought to have developed around 300 BCE. Some shaft tombs predate the tradition by more than 1000 years, for example, the shaft tomb at El Opeño in Michoacán has been dated to 1500 BCE but it is linked to central, rather than western Mexico. Like much else concerning the tradition, its origins are not well understood, although the valleys around Tequila, Jalisco, which include the archaeological sites of Huitzilapa and Teuchitlan, constitute its "undisputed core". The tradition lasted until at least 300 CE although, as noted above, there is disagreement on the end date.

=== Aztatlán Tradition ===
The archaeological ruins of "Los Toriles" are related to the Aztatlán tradition. Its buildings contain temples with stairs and worship places made of round stones jointed with clay, stone slabs and in some cases, with motif carved stones including spirals and a snake.

The Aztatlán tradition is chronologically located on a period from 700 BCE throughout 1520 CE, it is considered a western mesoamerican cultural event that shares cultural traits with the Toltec and received cultural influences from central highlands.

This rich tradition is manifested in their varied and beautiful complex ceramic and polished stone, obsidian, and jade, such as: arrowheads; human instruments, gods and animals. Metal work impacted the agricultural activity and environmental exploitation, manufactured utilitarian artifacts as well as ornamental and sumptuary objects.

Architecture reached its peak when ballgame courts appeared, their construction prompted the organizing of large well designed platforms, patios and squares with pyramids of certain elevations, walkways and paved roads, stairways, worship stone carvings, columns as roof support, roofs, posts, palm and grass, utilization of adobe walls and floors. The burial was common in large pots where skeletons lie in sitting or extended position, accompanied by offerings primarily made of pottery.

The " Aztatlán Tradition " flourished in the south of the State with the cultural development of Ixtlán de Río, on a period from around 750 BCE to 1110 CE, recognized as the Mid-Ixtlán period. Its early phase corresponds to the period that goes from 300 BCE to 600 CE.

From the "Aztatlán Tradition" the Shaft Tombs are highlighted, and it is noted that the discovery of Smoking pipes vestiges in Amapa imply that tobacco was farmed, there are also samples that demonstrate the use of metals, form manufacturing needles and fish hooks, also bricks for construction evidence was found.

In more recent times, within the "Aztatlán tradition", the now called Sentispac town, formerly known as Tzenticpac or Centicpac, was the seat of the lordship of the same name, which extended to Omitlán, Itzcuintla, Cillan and Atecomatlán and was occupied by Totorames native groups, who dominated and receiving tributes from Coras and Zayahuecos settled in the same coastal region.

=== Toponymy ===
The word "Ixtlán" is of Nahuatl origin, composed by the words "itz-" that means obsidian, and "-tlan", that means place with abundance, that is, "Place where obsidian is abundant".

According to the Mexican Municipalities Encyclopedia, Ixtlán, means place dedicated to Ehécatl, Wind God .

=== History ===
This important site was very possibly occupied from 300 BCE through 600 CE. During the first stage a cultural complex was developed known as the Shaft Tomb tradition in which offerings were placed inside of funeral chambers. Between 500 and 600 CE the Shaft Tomb tradition is abandoned and its development is registered within an ample cultural region known as Aztatlán, with an apogee towards 750 and 1,100 CE.

With the "Tradición Aztatlán" develops a new way of life and it begins towards 750 – 900 CE. This cultural development is identified as mid-Ixtlán period (750 - 1110) that represents the apogee of the city, dedicated to Ehécatl (Wind God); and late Ixtlán (1110–1525CE) identified by red smooth ceramic for domestic use as well as cajetes and tripod molcajetes decorated with white designs over red.

The city was founded in the 12th century, by Nahuatlaca tribes en route towards the Valley of Mexico, forming the Ahuacatlán Lordship, known by its building construction and trading of obsidian goods.

It is then that the urban settlement grows considerable with the construction of large terraces, palaces, temples and altars, acquiring a certain regional importance as manufacturing and commercial trade center. Although more than 85 mounds and structures have been located in the site, that remain still unexplored, at the moment it is only possible to visit fifteen structures, among them the building called Quetzalcoatl Temple that displays a circular shape with a parapet surrounding it and with peculiar perforations in cross shape.

The temple has two altars on top of the Mexico Central Plateau style. Other important buildings are structures called "Reliefs Palace", "Columns Palace", the "Four Column Palace" complex and the "Square Palace".

Ixtlán is the most studied archaeological zone in Nayarit. Its influence zone extended to the present day municipalities of Ixtlán del Rio, Ahuacatlán, Jala and Santa Maria del Oro. Their main towns were Cacalután, Tepuzhuacán, Mexpan, Zoatlán, Xala, Jomulco, Tequepexpan, Camotlán, Tetitlán, Acuitapilco and Zapotán.

=== Petroglyphs ===
In Santiago Ixcuintla, INAH has registered the existence of petroglyphs from the "Los Concheros" epoch, in the Las Parejas, Emérita, Yago, El Caballo and Acatán de las Piñas sites, with a total of 13 engravings, including the "Piedra Galana".

The presence of prehispanic vestiges in the form of Petroglyphs are registered in five areas, the most important are "El Terrero", "Sayulapa" and "El Veladero", which depict sgraffiti lines and representations of abstract figures, such as spirals with rays.

=== Ceramic ===
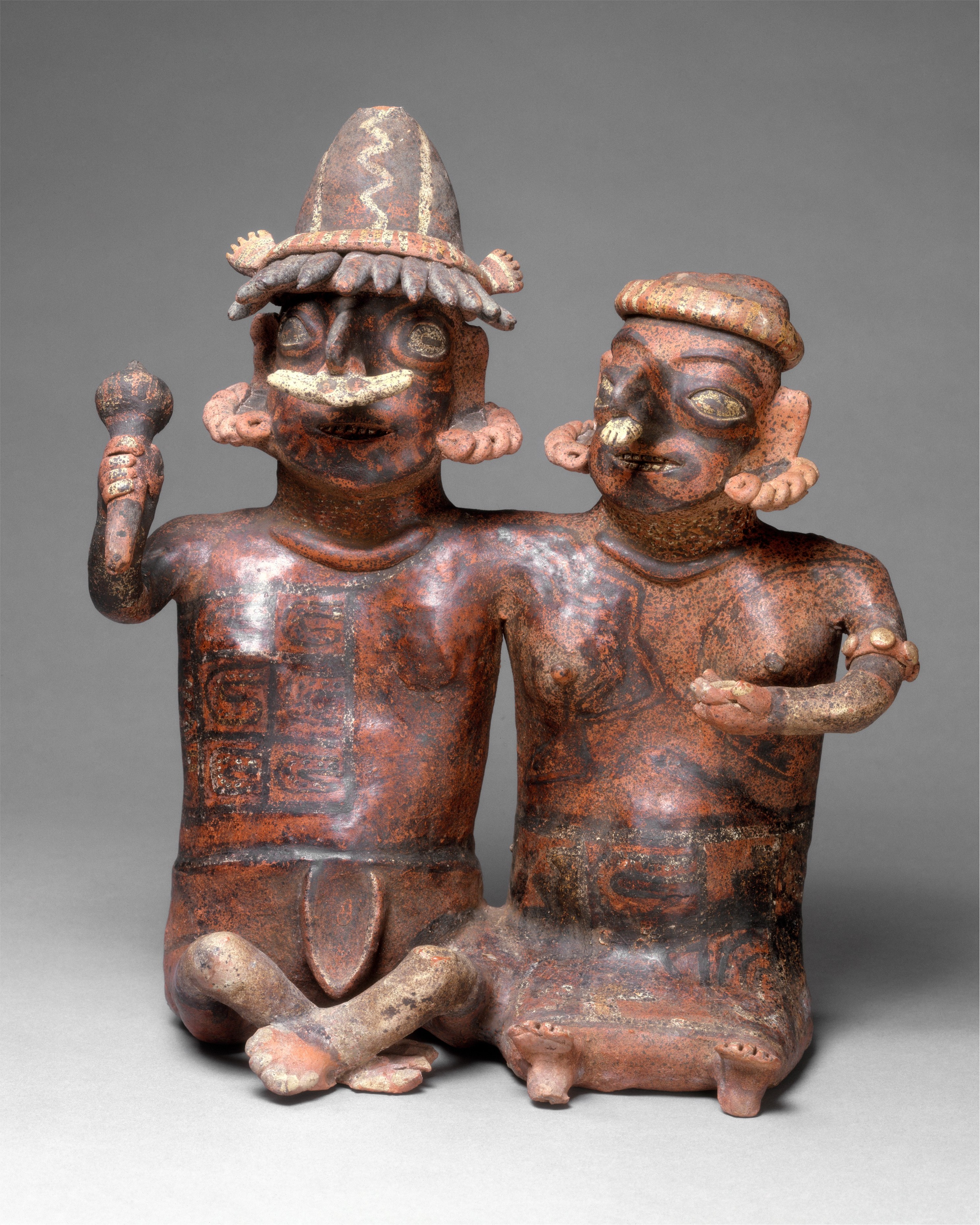
Ancestor pair; 1st century BC-3rd century AD; height: 43.8 cm (17 1/4 in.); Metropolitan Museum of Art (New York City)

This stage of prehispanic development distinguishes and identifies western Mexico from other mesoamerican cultural expressions, during the late formative period and early classical. The Nayarit shaft tomb complexes are identified within the early Ixtlán period (300 BCE to 300 CE), and three distinctive clay modeling styles have been defined: Chimisco, Ixtlán and San Sebastian.

The pottery of this tradition shows abundance of colors, predominating red, orange, yellow beige and the "negative" form. Common themes are human beings as warriors, musicians, women, sick people and couples.

== The Site ==
The Ixtlán del Río site is known as "Los Toriles", it was a constantly growing city and its inhabitants place huge importance to its buildings. They had urbanism knowledge, applied to an organized arrangement, with stairs, restricted accesses, open spaces, altars, sidewalks, drains, causeways, neighborhoods and palaces throughout the extensive city that flourished from 700 to 1200 CE.

It had its heyday as a city during the "Aztatlán Tradition" period, in an area extended over eighty hectares. In the late phase, that corresponds to the period from 1110 to 1525 CE, had artistic red smooth ceramic expressions for home use, vessels and molcajetes tripods with white decor on red. This same period developed the metallurgy used to produce ornamental, ritual objects and obsidian bifacial instruments. On slopes they built extensive terraces, palaces, worship spaces, people's homes, farmland areas and obsidian carving workshops.

It is clear that it is still unknown what was their original culture, it is only known that they were predecessors of the Coras and Huichol or Wixáritari peoples, they believed in life after death. Accordingly, what their name was is not known, these were communities a little older than 2,200 years, and are known as belonging to the Shaft Tomb Tradition, constructed in vertical wells, round or square, representing the maternal uterus.

Anthropologist Marina Anguiano concludes that at the Spaniards arrival to these lands, ethnic-linguistic groups existed of the Yuto-Aztec or Yuto-Nahuatl family, which had a socio-political structure divided into lordships, ruled by groups, possibly of noble rank, and a number of local lords.

This archaeological site is considered related to the Aztatlán tradition, of which Corinca was the last governor. Its constructions contain temples with stairways and altars made from round stones jointed with clay, slab stones and, in some cases, with carved stones with spirals and a serpent.

The site was founded, in the 12th century, by Nahuatlacas tribes while on their way to the Valley of Mexico, and formed part of the Ahuacatlán kingdom, known by its constructions and obsidian objects which they traded.

The site has an unusual pyramid for Mesoamerica; it is a round construction 24 meters diameter by four meters high. It has five stairways harmonically distributed around its perimeter. A wall that ends on top has small cruciform windows. Probably this was a ceremonial center dedicated to Quetzalcoatl, central image of the Toltec culture. The shaft tombs are the most representative funeral constructions of the area, although there are other modalities such as "shaft tombs" or earth graves where dead people were barely buried near the surface. Ceramics are constituted by spherical glasses with vertical walls tall neck and triple bell support. The most frequent ornamental motifs are flowers and streamlined butterflies, deer and tiger heads. There are many ceramic vessels decorated with white over red color rhombuses and segments.

Due to its special characteristics, ceramics and sculptures from this region are known as "Ixtlán style".

The small 30 to 40 centimeters high sculptures distinguish themselves by ornaments consisting of earrings and nose perforations, where they placed one or more hoops.

From the rich Ixtlán ceramics, scale models with excellent finishing are featured, from them we can intuit their forms of life, the social organization and the economic life characteristic of these towns. There are scale models that represent houses, groups in some activity and ballgame courts. These are always constructions with life and movement. Also, worth mentioning, are sculptures representing soldiers, identifiable from a spiked helmet; the chest is armor protected and in their hands a cane resembling a mallet. The lower part generally is naked.

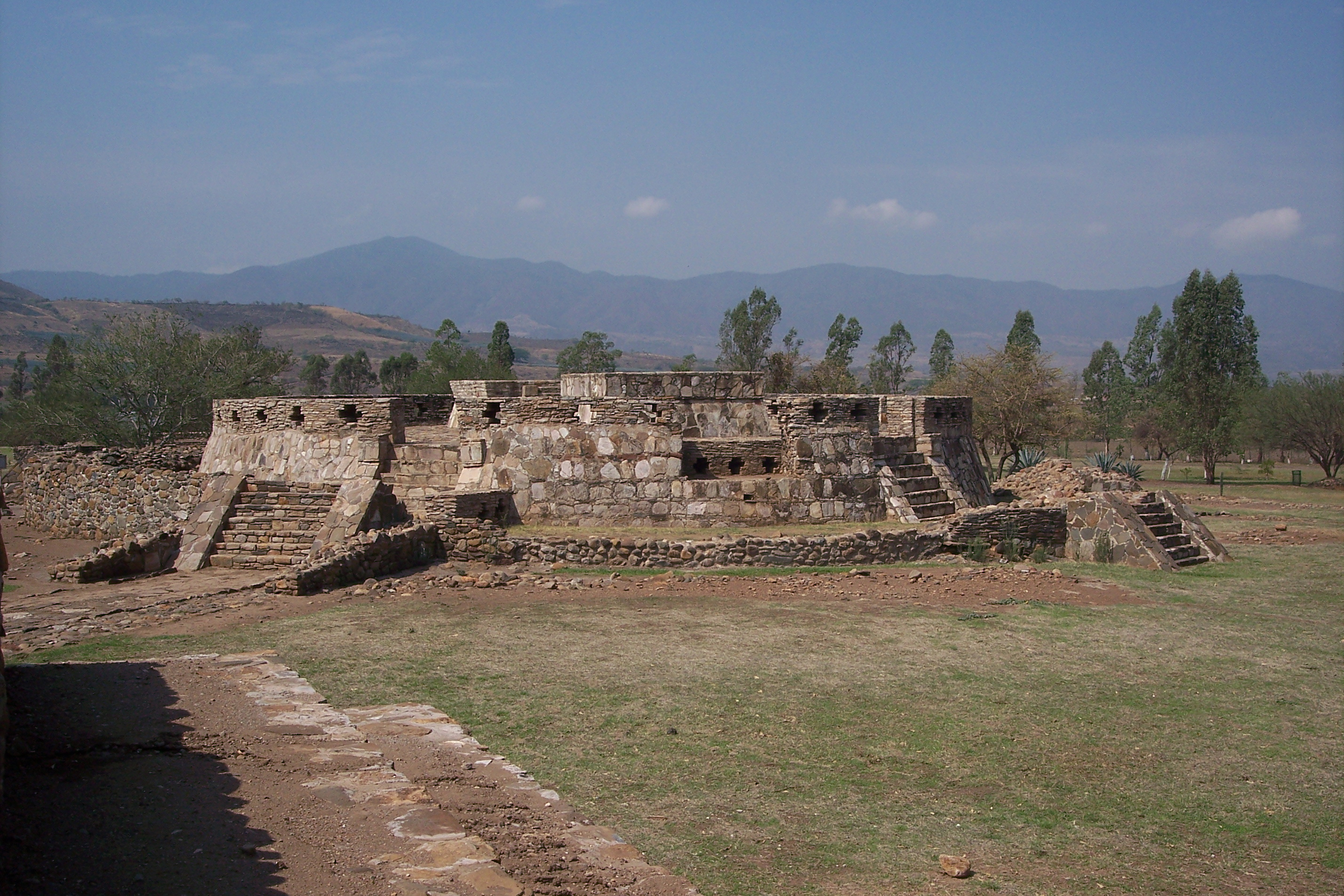
Ixtlán del Río another view of the Round Structure

== Structures ==
Ixtlán del Río archaeological site has a plaza, with an altar with four small stairways and to the sides buildings that appear to be small rectangular rooms.

These temples/rooms are built on platforms with adobe pilasters, as well as sidewalks and stairways.

One of these temples has a road paved with stone slabs, which leads to the round monument, discovered in 1948 by Prof. José Corona Núñez and eloquently describes his discovery, stating: "the round monument has 30 meters in diameter by 4 meters high;" sloped walls crowned by a perforated parapet with crosses, as if skylights, four access stairs, limited by alfardas die finished, some of them still have cross shaped handrails.

Above, within the round patio, limiting the parapets are pyramid bases, one to the north and another at the south, with stairs geared toward the center. The North has a smooth vertical panel and the south has a beveled cornice. According to the remains found, these bases maintained small altars with column portals, ceilings and stone altered battlements: one shaped as arrowheads, others composed of a disk with two circles engraved, this monument is called "Quetzalcoatl Temple" and is believed to belong to the Toltec horizon by the Toltec cultural traits observed in its architecture.

In earlier times, between 300 BCE and 600 CE., flourished a cultural complex known as shaft tombs tradition characterized by underground architecture and offerings deposited inside the funeral chambers. Its origins are ancient and have been found in the neighboring States of Colima, Zacatecas, Jalisco and Michoacán.

Around 500 to 600 CE, the shaft tomb tradition disappears and a new way of perceiving life starts from 750 to 900 CE. This cultural development is identified as the Aztatlán tradition and is known in the mid-Ixtlán period (750 to 1110) which represents the apogee of this city dedicated to the God of the wind; and late Ixtlán (1110 to 1525) identified by red smooth ceramics household items and cajetes and tripod molcajetes with white decor on Red.

One of the temples has a stone slab paved road, which leads to the round building of section A.

=== Section A ===
Corresponds to the initial explorations of the site, composed of four structures; two of which are restored with rectangular shape with columns to the front, that limit spaces between the rooms, these two structures are part of the plaza with pyramidal foundation with central altar and other unexplored structures (mounds to the north and east of the plaza). The highlight of this complex is the circular pyramid, discovered in 1948 by Prof. Jose Corona Nuñez, it is the most important structure of the archaeological site that, from its design and finishing, constitutes one of the most beautiful works of the prehispanic architecture in western Mexico. "The monument is of round base 24 meters in diameter and 4 meters high, originally was a cylinder with vertical walls (compact drum) crowned with a perforated parapet with small cruciform windows that give the construction the aspect of a large brazier, with five stairs harmonically distributed in its contour"; in the superior part there are two rectangular altars, and it is known as a Quetzalcoatl or Ehécatl temple, due to its architectonic characteristics and elements.

=== Section B ===
It is composed by two plazas bordered by structures that correspond to buildings foundations and small pyramidal shape altars. Both plazas have nine monuments each, rectangular form, explored and restored; in center is a small foundation, similar to the ceremonial altar; dimensions and height varies and is in relation to the site topography and the plaza needs. The buildings stairways face the plaza, which has three closed spaces with one in front open and roof supporting pillars. Also there are remains of dirt floors, evidence of prehispanic occupation; constructive systems base in retaining walls with relief carved stone walls, with symbols religious and animal motifs.

=== Section C ===
It is the entrance to the archaeological zone; the south part has three explored and recovered structures that form part of a larger complex of plaza and buildings with a central altar. From the explored constructions one is outstanding, with two rectangular bodies and a single story whose stairways face towards the plaza. Also there are large columns that were used for support the roof of two large halls; the one to the east has a room and stairway integrated to the wall behind the structure.

=== Central Altar and Plaza C ===
Is a two bodied pyramidal shape structure with stairways in all four sides; an "alfarda", ended on a dice shaped element in the top. Two bodied Pyramidal foundation. Is located in the center of Plaza C; its stairway faces west and is limited by two unexplored mounds, that are part of the plaza. The structure, just as other monuments, has stone retaining walls that were stucco covered.

== Shaft Tombs ==
During prehispanic times, western cultures buried to their dead in shaft tombs, these are vertical wells 1.5 to 16 meters deep, where diverse sculptures were placed as offering for the deceased; these were of various types of polychrome ceramic figures; animal forms, anthropomorphous and small and medium size scale models, which measured from five to 80 centimeters.

The ceramic figures date back to the late Preclassical period (400 BCE to 200 CE) and to the Classical period (200 to 650 CE), these were discovered by archaeologists since 1945 until recent years in areas included in the states of Nayarit, Colima and Jalisco, where this funeral activity was practiced.

In the case of the Ixtlán del Rio Archaeological Zone, the figures represent funeral processions, villages, people lying down or in beds, the flier and ballgame rituals, were modeled in reddish clay and decoration painted with black, red, orange, yellow and beige colors.

According to art historian Lizeth Barreto Saucedo, these sculptures were modeled with reddish clay, dried and cooked in open fire.

The funeral processions scale models are square or round, the carved figures depict many people; musicians, moving towards a house, while carrying the dead person for burial; they carry food plates and practice the cheek perforation ritual practice.

The pieces representing the flier ritual, represents an individual dressed as a bird, on top of a pole on a flying simulation pose, can be leaning face down on the post or standing up looking upwards, houses are seen below and many people watching the ritual, some dance or play.

Similarly, there are ball game sculptures, similar to the Mesoamerican I-shaped structure, the difference here is that there are houses in the ends of the representation, and some spectators.

The dancers and musicians figures not only appear in the processions scale models, there are also exclusive pieces of people groups in circular dances or playing instruments, such as drums, snails and flutes.

The largest sculptures (20 to 80 centimeters) are anthropomorphous figures decorated with facial painting and different types from clothes, some are standing up and other are seated. Women carry vessels or children, and men carry balls or instruments, some are soldiers with shields. Figures of both genders carry jewels, earflaps and cut shell collars. The facial painting is naturalist and streamlined.

Also sculptures with human figures representations are known with cheek perforations, in which three to four people are displayed (men and women) interconnected by an instrument that crosses their cheeks.

The individuals lying down or in beds are similar to those from Veracruz, emphasizing that are figures tied to a bed, which would seem to indicate that are women dead from childbirth or convalescent.

Five types of scale models have been classified, representing houses, measuring approximately 18 centimeters high by 20 wide and are distinguished by its shed roof with the corners raised in triangles form.

The type 1 house lacks walls, only shows the roof and people inside. House type 2 has an ample room with walls. Type 3, the building half walls are leaned. Type 4, has two levels, with a room on each level and stairs. And type 5 is similar to Type 4, except that the house is full of people.

Among the scale models, there are also villages with a circular construction in the center, very similar to the pyramid of the Guachimontones Archaeological site in Jalisco, surrounded by houses as previously mentioned.

Shaft tombs are vertical wells, whose surface can be circular or square, and have a depth of between 1.5 and 16 meters, and a width of between 0.80 and one meter; there are two types: familiar burials underneath the rooms, or cemeteries.

== See also ==
- Western Mexico shaft tomb tradition
- Teuchitlan tradition
- Guachimontones
- Cora people — native groups in western Nayarit, México.
  - Cora language
- Muisca—Chibcha peoples
- Chibcha language
  - Chibchan language family — Central America & Colombia.
- Danza de los Voladores de Papantla — Voladores Ceremony.
