= José Corona Nuñez =

Mexican author (1906–2002)

José Corona Núñez
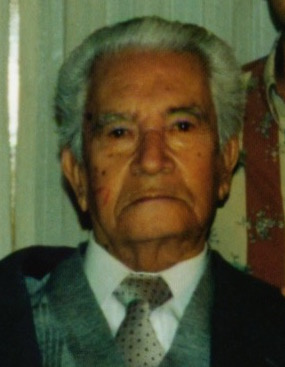
- Photograph of José Corona Núñez in December 1994 at his house in Morelia, Michoacán, México
- Born: 4 July 1906; Cuitzeo, Michoacan, Mexico.
- Died: 2 January 2002 (aged 95); Morelia, Michoacan, Mexico
- Occupations: Anthropologist, Historian, Professor
- Spouse(s): Maria Ramirez (21 Jun 1914 – 27 Sept 2014)
- Children: Araceli Corona Ramirez 1931-2016, Rene Juan Corona Ramirez 1933-2008, Cuitzeman Corona Ramirez 1940-/

José Corona Núñez (July 4, 1906 – January 6, 2002) was a Mexican author, anthropologist, and history professor who discovered several important archeological sites throughout Mexico. His main body of work revolved around his native state of Michoacán, and in particular the Tarascan or Purépecha culture.

== Early life ==
José Corona Núñez was born in Cuitzeo del Porvenir, Michoacán, on July 4, 1906. His father was Marcelino Corona García and his mother was María del Pilar Núñez Berrospe. From an early age he attended the Agustino Convent of Cuitzeo and helped with the various common rituals.

== Education and religious studies ==
Through his involvement with the convent Corona Núñez decided to pursuit priesthood. He would later clarify that his primary motivation was to continue to learn and given his family's limited resources private schooling was not an option. In January 1920 he began his seminary studies in the San Pablo Convent of Yuriria, Guanajuato. There he studied Latin, Greek, French, Grammar, Religion, and Mexican history, amongst other topics. He then moved to the Seminario Tridentino in San Luis Potosí to continue his studies as a hermit and continue his formal studies. On October 2, 1923, at the age of 17, he became Friar Angel in the Order of Saint Augustine. However, the following year he resigned by mailing a letter to the Prior General in Rome asking for his removal. The last religious ceremony in which he participated took place in his native convent of Cuitzeo, in which he was disrobed and he removed all emblems (belt, cross, etc.) and signed a document addressed to the Vatican declaring the acknowledgement of his request, on April 5, 1926.

== Career ==
Corona Núñez received a scholarship to attend the National School of Anthropology and History ("Escuela Nacional de Antropología e Historia"). As a student he worked with Donald D. Brand in his work "Quiroga, A Mexican Municipio". After his studies he became a rural teacher and eventually director of various primary schools throughout Michoacan. He later became Director of the Anthropology Department of the State of Nayarit (1946-1951), founded the Anthropology Museums of Tepic and Colima, and was in charge of the Anthropology Department of the University of Michoacan.

As an anthropologist José Corona Núñez discovered the circular pyramid of the Ixtlán del Rio archeological site.

In 1951, the National Institute of Anthropology and History designated Corona as director of the Regional Museum of Guadalajara. He had to leave that position in 1955.

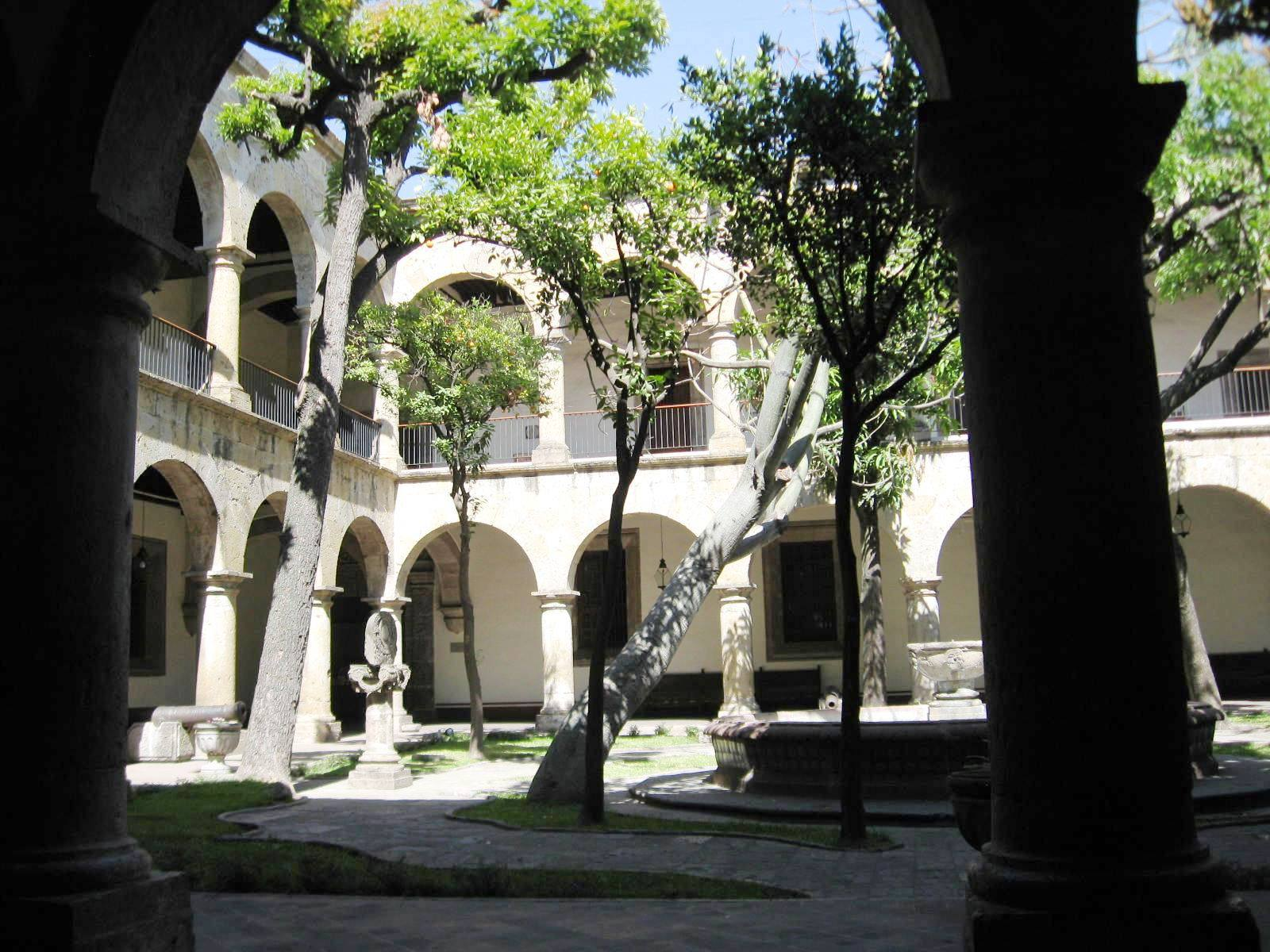
Main Patio of the Regional Museum of Guadalajara.

== Bibliography ==
José Corona Núñez created more than 100 articles and published more than a dozen books throughout the 20th century. Some of the more well known are:

- Mitologia tarasca (1957, Fondo de Cultura Económica)
- Historia de los antiguos habitantes de Michoacán: desde su origen hasta la conquista española (1988, Balsal Editores, SA de CV)
- Voces del pasado: antología: cuentos, leyendas, estudios etno-históricos (1995), Centro de Estudios sobre la Cultura Nicolaita ISBN 9687376325
- Diccionario Geográfico Tarasco-Náhuatl (1993, UMSNH)
- Carácuaro de Morelos (1991) Centro de Estudios sobre la Cultura Nicolaita, Universidad Michoacana de San Nicolás de Hidalgo
