= Teuchitlán culture =

Culture in what is now Mexico (350 BCE–450/500 CE)

- Western Mexico and the Teuchitlán culture
- Period: Late Formative to the Classic Period
- Dates: 350 BCE to 450/500 CE
- Major sites: Los Guachimontones, Tabachines, Huitzilapa

The Teuchitlán culture was one of several related cultures in West Mexico during the Late Formative to Classic period (350 BCE to 450/500 CE). Situated in the Tequila Valleys of Jalisco, the Teuchitlán culture shared in the tradition of burying some of their dead in shaft and chamber tombs. Archaeological work from the past few decades has demonstrated that West Mexico was not occupied by one homogeneous culture, historically referred to as the shaft tomb tradition, that stretched from Nayarit, Jalisco, and Colima. Instead, West Mexico was composed of multiple cultures with several distinct commonalities.

The Teuchitlán culture is an archaeologically defined culture named after the town of Teuchitlán where the largest Teuchitlán culture site, Los Guachimontones, is located. Los Guachimontones is one of several dozen sites in the region, but is most notable for the number and size of its ceremonial buildings. Like many other Mesoamerican cultures, the Teuchitlán culture's writing system did not survive the ravages of time and has not been recovered in the archaeological record, although scholars have found evidence for the existence of scribes at the nearby site of Huitzilapa. Archaeologists do not know what they may have called themselves or what language they may have spoken. The toponym for the town of Teuchitlán dates to the Late Postclassic/Conquest period and could have its origins in one of several Nahuatl speaking migrations to the region after 500 CE.

As with other West Mexican cultures during this period, the Teuchitlán culture buried some, but not all, of their dead in shaft and chamber tombs dug into the earth. The deceased were interred in these chambers and mortuary goods such as ceramic vessels, hollow and solid ceramic figures, shell jewelry, conch shells, jadeite, quartz, ground stone, and paper were placed within.

== History ==
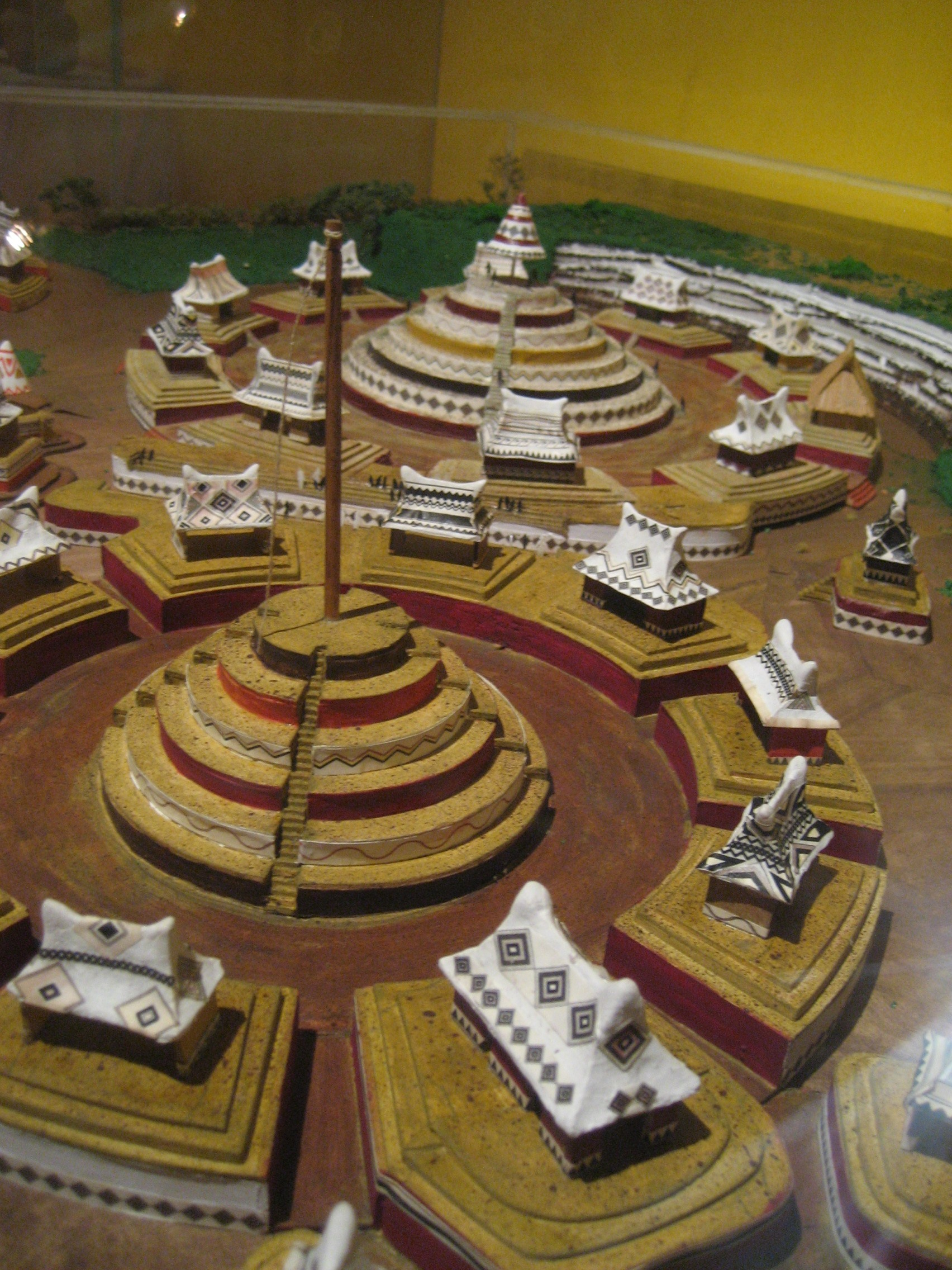
A reconstruction of 'Circle 2' (in foreground) and 'Circle 1' at Guachimontones

Archaeologists still poorly understand the origins and development of the Teuchitlán culture. No Early or Middle Formative sites in the Tequila Valleys have been excavated yet. However, the nearby Early Formative site of El Opeño, Michoacan and somewhat more distantly located Middle Formative site of Mascota, Jalisco suggest a long continuity of shaft and chamber use in West Mexico. Phil Weigand documented several Middle Formative mounds in the Tequila Valleys in the 1970s and 1980s. These large, low mounds supposedly contained burials that looters had robbed in the past. However, Weigand never published more than some plan maps and descriptions of these mounds.

During the Late Formative period, the Tequila Valleys experienced a surge in population density resulting in the proliferation of surface and subsurface architecture. The sub-surface architecture, in the form of shaft and chamber tombs, is more familiar to archaeologists and the public. This is a result of the rampant looting of tombs starting in the 19th century and continuing until the 1970s, though some looting continues to a lesser extent. Looters focused on shaft and chamber tombs to retrieve the hollow and solid ceramic figures sometimes placed within as mortuary offerings to the deceased. These ceramic figures were sold on the art market to collectors and museums in Mexico and abroad. Painters Diego Rivera and Frida Kahlo were frequent collectors of ceramic figures from West Mexico, often incorporating them into their works such as Diego Rivera’s “La Civilización Tarasca” (1950). Other notable collectors include Vincent Price whose collection Kahlúa used for advertisements in the 1960s. The Los Angeles County Museum of Art and the Gilcrease Museum also have extensive West Mexican collections.

One of the defining features of the Teuchitlán culture is the construction and use of circular temples called guachimontones. These buildings consist of several architectural features: a basal circular platform that acts as a patio, a ring platform called a banquette constructed on top of the patio platform, an even number of quadrangular platforms constructed on top of the banquette, and a stepped altar located in the center of the patio. Guachimontones are most heavily concentrated in the Tequila Valleys, but examples are found outside of the cultural boundaries of the Teuchitlán culture. Guachimontones can be found near Comala, Colima, La Gloria, Guanajuato, and Bolaños, Jalisco.

Weigand had proposed that the construction of guachimontones followed on the construction of shaft and chamber tombs. The shift from sub-surface to surface architecture was a shift in how power transferred from the association with the dead to power held by the living. However, this hypothesis no longer holds up to scrutiny. Excavations at the site of Los Guachimontones place the construction date of the largest guachimonton in the Tequila Valleys, Circle 1, between 160 and 60 BCE. The construction of Circle 1 predates the monumental tomb at El Arenal and the elaborate tomb at Huitzilapa.

Recently, Beekman proposed a different explanation for the relationship between guachimontones and shaft and chamber tombs. Beekman argues that around Los Guachimontones, cultural rules and norms were most heavily enforced among the population with power being shared relatively equally between ruling elite lineages. As one moves away from Los Guachimontones, ruling elites that managed a smaller population and site, were able to exert a greater degree of control. This allowed elites to invest more heavily in the construction of tombs that promoted their lineage than in public architecture used by other elites and the community.

== Characteristics ==
=== Shaft and Chamber Tombs ===
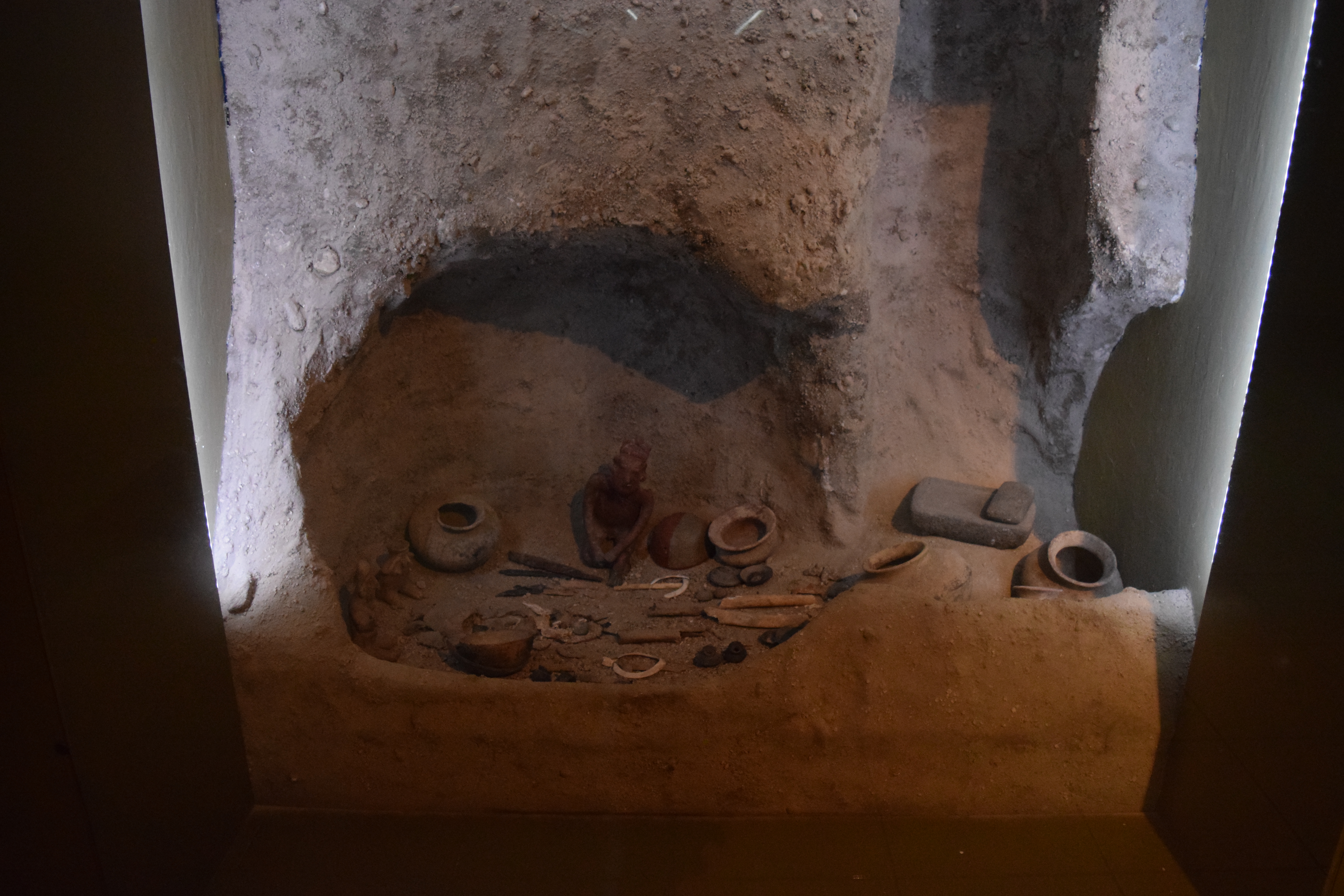
Recreation of a shaft and chamber tomb from the Casa de Cultura in Tala, Jalisco, Mexico

Shaft and chamber tombs were typically used for related family members, possibly part of a lineage. Archaeologists consider shaft and chamber tombs to be an expression of broader Mesoamerican beliefs. Chambers may represent artificial caves which are associated with the Underworld being a dark, watery space located underground. The accompaniment of conch shells with the deceased may reinforce that association.

Archaeologists in the Tequila Valleys have documented some of the deepest and most richly furnished shaft and chamber tombs in West Mexico. The site of El Arenal boasts a shaft and chamber tomb with a shaft depth of 16 meters. Archaeologists excavating at the site of Huitzilapa discovered a shaft and chamber tomb consisting of two chambers, six individuals, and hundreds of artifacts. Mortuary goods consisted of complete and broken ceramic figures, vessels, ground stone, jadeite, quartz, shell jewelry, conch shells, and the oldest amate paper in Mesoamerica (dated to 73 CE). While archaeologists in both Nayarit and Colima have documented more shaft and chamber tombs than in Jalisco, none are as elaborate, deep, or large as those found in the Tequila Valleys.

=== Guachimontones ===
Guachimontones are the circular ceremonial buildings constructed by the Teuchitlán culture people within the Tequila Valleys. A typical guachimonton (colloquially called a circle in both English and Spanish) consists of four basic architectural features: the patio, the banquette, the altar, and the platforms. The patio consists of a circular platform that forms the base of the building and dictates its maximum diameter. Constructed on top of the patio are both the banquette and the altar. The banquette consists of a ring-shaped platform whose outer diameter conforms to the diameter of the patio platform. The inner diameter of the banquette is set somewhere in the patio space dictating the size of the platforms and constraining the available patio space. Constructed in the center of the patio is the altar that exhibits a range of diameters, sizes, and shapes and constrains the available patio space. Typically, constructed on top of the banquette is an even number of quadrangular platforms ranging in number from four to sixteen.

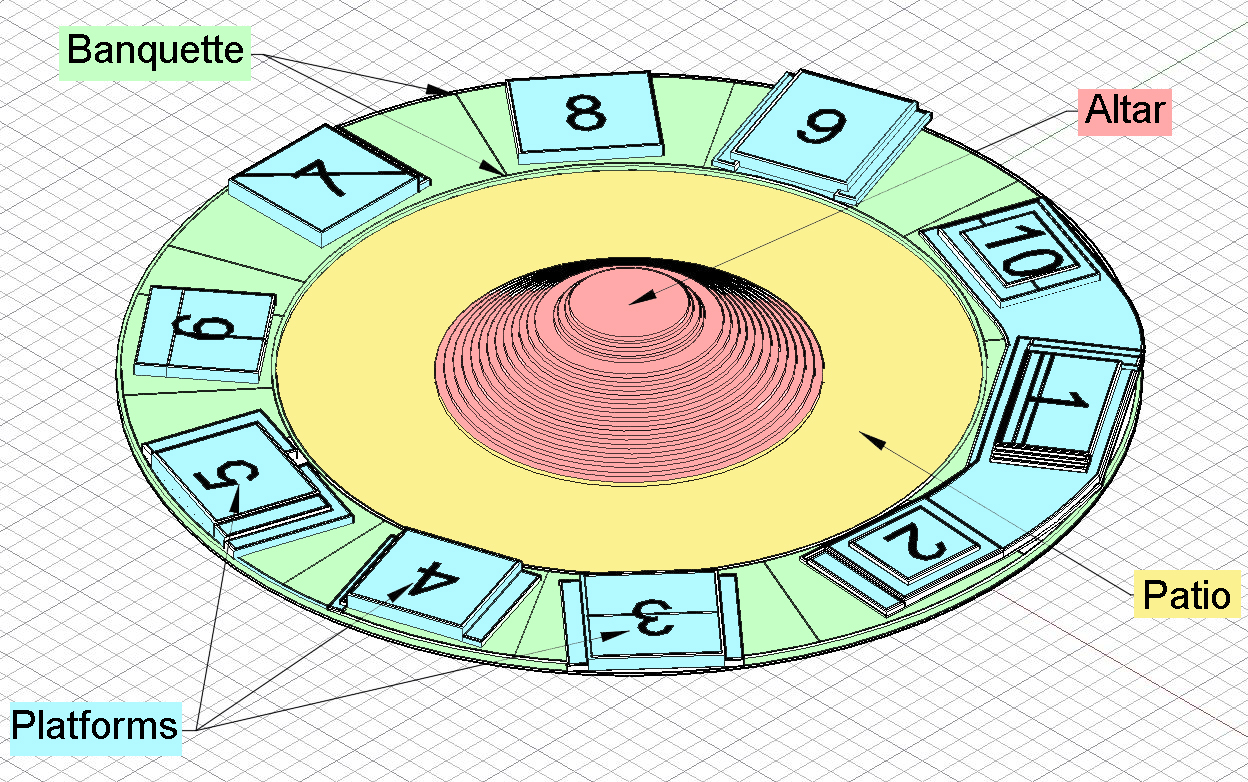
Color-coded schematic of a guachimonton indicating its various architectural features

Scholars have proposed several ideological or cosmological interpretations for the guachimontones. J. Charles Kelley. was the first to suggest that the ceramic models looted from shaft and chamber tombs depicting one to four house structures and a pole in the center space with a person perched on top may be a depiction of a version of the volador ceremony practiced in Mexico today. Some of these models depict two poles, one straight, and one curved, perhaps as a way to indicate motion. Christopher Beekman expanded upon this idea several decades later to support the volador idea and to suggest practices could include other pole ceremonies known elsewhere from Mesoamerica. Kelley also suggested that the altar of a guachimonton might represent an artificial mountain, a cosmologically significant feature to Mesoamerican beliefs. Mountains were where the gods dwelt, where water flowed from, and where one could find caves to the underworld. Shaft and chamber tombs may represent artificial caves with their location underground. Together, tombs, guachimontones, and a pole ceremony, depicts the Mesoamerican cosmology of an underworld, an earthly plane, and the heavens.

Christopher Witmore interprets the form of the guachimonton, with the altar in the center and platforms arranged around the patio space, to represent the sun. Witmore draws upon Wixáritari (Huichol) ethnographic work to suggest that the guachimonton may be an ancient version of the contemporary Wixáritari tuki. He compares the structures to ideological concepts of the Wixáritari deities Grandfather Fire and Father Sun.

Alternatively, Christopher Beekman suggests that a typical eight platform guachimonton might represent eight-row maize, a variety of maize with its origins in West Mexico. If one cuts a maize cob in half, the eight kernels and cob core looks similar to that of a guachimonton. This association with maize may be linked to volador ceremonies or other Mesoamerican pole-related ceremonies, such as pole-climbing and green maize ceremonies.

In her dissertation, Butterwick sees guachimontones as places of ancestor worship and of feasting. Drawing upon excavation data from the site of Huitzilapa and looted ceramic models from tombs that depict simplified guachimontones, Butterwick argues that guachimontones may simply be four platform groups with a central ancestral shrine made larger. The ceramic models without a pole in their center often depict the spaces as a hub of activities from marriage ceremonies, to food preparation, to music making and dancing, and even warfare. The ceramics found at Huitzilapa outside of the tomb tend to be serving ware and their distribution suggests feasting was an important activity. A similar model is viable for Los Guachimontones despite its larger size and lack of documented elaborate shaft tombs.

== Culture ==
=== Politics ===
Three different political systems have been proposed for the Teuchitlán culture with the site of Los Guachimontones having a role in all three systems. Phil Weigand and Christopher Beekman proposed the first in 1998 that consisted of a segmentary state model. In this model, there is a concentrated core and a broad surrounding hinterland. Within the core of the segmentary state, control is exerted through ceremonialism rather than political force. The Tequila Valleys constitute the core of this segmentary state based on the number of sites with guachimontones and the size of the guachimontones. Guachimontones located outside of the Tequila Valleys are then considered peripheral regions that exploited rare resources for the core. Within the segmentary state, Weigand argued a settlement hierarchy existed between the major sites in the region. Los Guachimontones was at the top of this proposed hierarchy. Smaller, but still large sites, like Ahualulco, Navajas, and Santa Quiteria, would have provided further administrative control over the region. Smaller sites were hypothesized act as loci for minor elite control or as a way to promote population cohesion.

Lorenza Lopez Mestas in 2011 proposed that the Teuchitlán culture consisted of a collection of lineage or clan-based chiefdoms. In this model, each ceremonial center in the Tequila Valleys was the site of a chiefdom. These chiefdoms would have banded together in defense of the valleys but would have also engaged in conflict and trade with each other. Lopez Mestas argued the primary mechanism of power that chiefs relied upon was their ability to engage in trade for exotic or prestigious goods, like jadeite and shell, from outside of the Tequila Valleys. Chiefly power was not absolute, however, and was based upon consensus rather than coercion. Failing to perform their necessary duties could result in a loss of power. One mechanism to maintain power would have been feasting. Lopez Mestas suggests that elites would try to convince commoners to donate artisan goods or domestic surplus to increase chiefly wealth and status. With this newfound wealth and status, chiefs could then hold larger feasts and gain control over even more resources.

Beekman later proposed a new political structure for the Teuchitlán culture. In 2008 he suggested a model in which Teuchitlán culture centers were ruled by corporate groups composed of multiple lineages, clans, or elite families. These corporate groups would have coopered together to form a broader collective governance. Beekman’s model is based on his excavations at two smaller sites, Llano Grande and Navajas, and his examination of the architecture. Irregularities within the construction of these structures suggest that separate labor groups were employed for construction, specifically the platforms of the guachimonton. These differences likely indicate a form of competition and status signaling.

=== Food ===
Food remains recovered archaeologically are somewhat sparse in the Tequila Valleys because of limited excavations focused on other contexts. However, evidence for some food can be gleaned from limited ethnohistoric, art historic, and archaeological data.

In the Autlán-Tuxcacuesco area to the south of Tequila Valley, Kelly remarked how indigenous peoples in the region in 1525 relied heavily on the maguey plant. The leaves were chopped off and roasted for food, the fibers in the plant were gathered to spin into thread, and for brewing. Maize and chili were important crops as well as guamúchil, plum, copal jocote, guaje, arrayán, sapote, and guava.

Butterwick took a more art historical approach to food in her discussion of ritual feasting at the site of Huitzilapa. Turning a critical eye to the ceramic models from West Mexico, Butterwick notes that food is depicted as either cylindrical, globular, discoid, or lump. She suggests that these shapes correspond to tamales or ears of maize, fruits, cakes, or beans, respectively.

Zizumbo-Villareal et al. (2014) approach food in West Mexico through a hybridized ethnographic, art historic, and archaeological approach. They conducted open-ended interviews with people around the Zapotitlan region of Jalisco. These interviews inquired to the dishes and beverages they recalled from the time of their great grandfathers. They cross checked the results of these interviews with archaeological and art historical data. The result are 29 native species to the region, 4 native species likely introduced from other parts of Mesoamerica, and up to 75 wild native plants that were likely part of the Late-Formative to Classic period diet. These foods include varieties of maize, agave, squash, beans, and chili.

=== Art ===
The most recognizable form of artwork by the Teuchitlán culture are its hollow and solid ceramic figures. Like many other West Mexican cultures during the Late Formative to Classic period, the Teuchitlán culture created ceramic figures depicting a variety of people in different styles, wearing differing clothing and accoutrements, and in a variety of poses and actions. The hollow figurine styles most commonly found in the Tequila Valleys are the Ameca-Etzatlan, San Juanto, and Tala styles. Hollow figurines often depict warriors, ball players, high status individuals, and people holding vessels.

Ceramic vessels come in a variety of styles with the most notable being Oconahua Red-on-White vessels with its characteristic red geometric pattern on a white background. While patterns tend to be geometric in design, there are some rare examples of animal depictions. The most common motif is that of the serpent, which may be related to broader Mesoamerican cosmology.

=== Ballgame ===
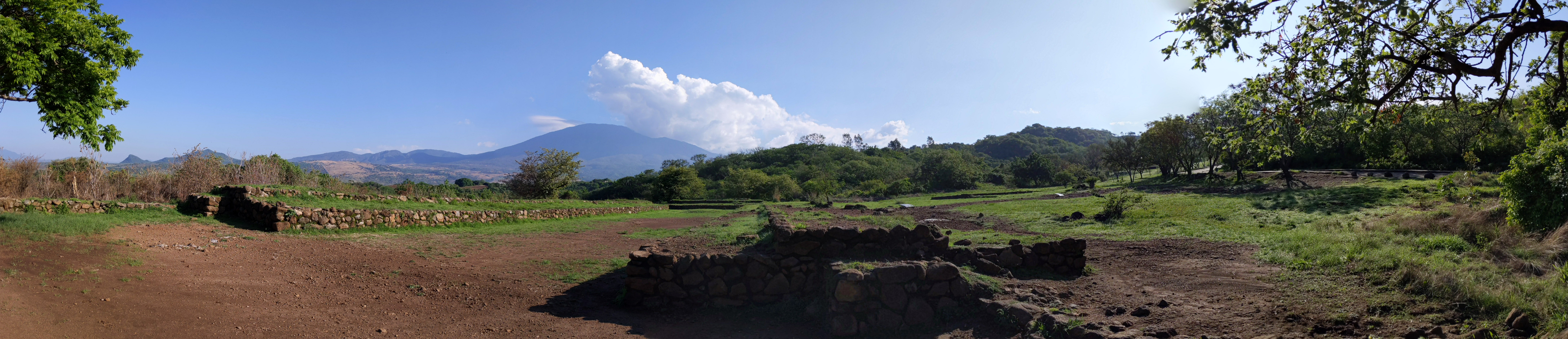
A panorama of Ball Court 2 from the site of Los Guachimontones

The history for the Mesoamerican ball game in West Mexico dates back to the Early Formative period (1500 – 900 BCE) with the site of El Opeño. El Opeño is located just southeast of Lake Chapala over the Jalisco/Michoacán border. The site consists of a shaft tomb cemetery, though short staircases lead to the tombs rather than vertical shafts. Within several of these tombs, ceramic figurines were discovered interred with the dead. A group of 16 figurines were found together in one tomb. Eight of the figurines appear to depict people playing the ball game. Five figures are nude men with various pieces of ball game equipment and three are nude women.

The Late Formative to Classic period continued to depict ball players in some of their ceramic figures. These figures are often seen holding a ball. Solid ceramic dioramas or models from the greater West Mexico region depict multiple people playing the ball game and often accompanied by spectators sitting or standing on the ball court walls. Some figurines depict warrior/ball players with a mix of clothing and equipment, a common association elsewhere in Mesoamerica. Some of these figures show people wearing protective leather pants. Some of the skeletal remains from Huitzilapa have lesions on their arms and hips, consistent with atlatl use and hitting balls or falling upon their hips for the ball game.

Ball courts in the Tequila Valley are typically of the I-shape variety. Two long, narrow, parallel platforms form the playing place while two end platforms designate the end of the playing space. Unlike other Mesoamerican ball courts, Teuchitlán culture ball courts do not have sloping sides. Instead, the two parallel platforms have straight vertical sides. These platforms are not very tall; Ball Court 2 at Los Guachimontones is only 1.1 meters tall. Ball courts are typically attached to a guachimonton with a platform from a guachimonton forming the end platform for the ball court. However, free standing ball courts do exist such as Ball Court 2 at Los Guachimontones.

== Notable Sites ==
=== Los Guachimontones ===
Los Guachimontones is the largest Teuchitlán culture site in the Tequila Valleys. The archaeological site is located in the hills just north of the town of Teuchitlán. The largest guachimontones in the Tequila Valleys are located here with the site commanding a central position within the region. Currently, the earliest documentation of the site dates to the late 19th century when Adela Breton visited and photographed the site. The site remained relatively unknown to archaeologists until the 1970s when Weigand (1974) and Mountjoy and Weigand (1974) published the first reports on the structures. Excavation and restoration began in 1999 and continued to 2010. According to the Instituto Nacional de Antropología e Historia visitor statistics, Los Guachimontones is Jalisco’s most visited site and Mexico’s 13th most visited in 2019.

=== Tabachines ===
The site of Tabachines is located in the nearby Atemejac Valley, which present-day Guadalajara now dominates. Tabachines was discovered in the 1970s as the city of Guadalajara sought to expand a highway. The site consists of an unlooted cemetery of shaft and chamber tombs dating to the Late Formative to Classic periods and an unlooted box tomb cemetery dating to the later Epiclassic. There was no surface architecture in the area of both cemeteries. It is possible that this particular location held some sort of significance from one period to the next despite dramatic social and political changes experienced within the region.

Tabachines is of importance to understanding the Teuchitlán culture because it offered a plethora of data on shaft and chamber tombs. While these tombs are not as elaborate as the ones documented by archaeologists or raided by looters in the Tequila Valleys, many of the same types of mortuary goods were found in situ within these tombs. This allowed for the creation of a ceramic typology to help provide relative dates for other archaeology sites.

=== El Arenal ===
El Arenal was partially explored by Corona Núñez in the 1950s and then later revisited by Long in the 1960s. Corona Núñez excavated the partially looted monumental tomb. The monumental shaft for the tomb measures 16 meters deep. At the base of the shaft, two passages lead to different chambers. One chamber has a passage leading to a third chamber. Most of the contents were looted, but Corona Núñez did recover poorly preserved skeletal fragments within the tomb. Some of the tomb contents in the form of ceramic figures were in the nearby town of Santa Rosalia. Photographs of these pictures provide a partial idea of what was once in the tombs.

In the 1960s Long discovered several unlooted tombs at the site. While these tombs were not as large as the monumental tomb, and many had filled in with mud and dirt, they nonetheless provided important data regarding the mortuary goods found within tombs in this region. A recreation of the El Arenal tomb can be found at the Casa de la Cultura de Etzatlan in Etzatlan, Jalisco. Tomb contents include hollow ceramic figures, jade beads, ceramic vessels, skeletal fragments, ground stone, and shell jewelry.

=== Huitzilapa ===
Huitzilapa is one of the most important Teuchitlán culture sites in the Tequila Valleys. Located just east of Magdalena, archaeologists excavated the first monumental elaborate shaft tomb in the region. While San Sebastian contained a large number of artifacts, Huitzilapa’s tomb contained tens of thousands of artifacts divided between its two chambers. Notable tomb contents include conch shells decorated in pseudo-cloisonné, jadeite atatl finger loops, hollow ceramic figures, greenstone figurines, and amate paper along with ceramic vessels, ground stone, and shell jewelry. The amate paper, found near the cranium of one of the individuals, was dated to 73 CE making it the oldest paper in Mesoamerica.

Skeletal analysis of the six individuals found within the tombs revealed that five of them shared similar spinal defects. One individual, an older woman, did not share this defect. This suggests that five of the individuals were closely related, likely part of the same family. The older woman was perhaps the spouse of one of the other deceased. These individuals were likely elites at Huitzilapa based on the amount and quality of their mortuary goods and the placement of the tomb within the site. The tomb at Huitzilapa is a stark contrast against the simpler tombs at Tabachines or even the frequently re-used tombs at Bolaños. The relatedness and status of the individuals suggests that power and authority may derive from elite lineages that have long histories at their site.

=== San Sebastian ===
While San Sebastian is by no means a monumental tomb, it is one of the few unlooted tombs excavated by archaeologists in the region. San Sebastian provided Long (1966) with important data regarding shaft tomb contents, ceramic types, and ceramic figure types. These data, along with radiocarbon dates, allowed Long to create an early chronology for the Tequila Valleys region. This chronology allowed some changes in ceramic vessels and figures to be tracked through time, though this may be limited to just the Magdalena Lake Basin region.

The tomb contained the remains of nine individuals along with a number of ground stone artifacts, obsidian tools, bone and shell jewelry, shell trumpet, ceramic vessels, green stone, and ceramic figures. Of note is the placement of two ceramic figures near the entrance of the tomb. A male figure was found at the east side and a female figure at the west side of the entrance. This placement could relate to broader Mesoamerican cosmology in which deceased male warriors accompanied the sun as it rose in the east to its zenith while women who died in childbirth accompanied the sun from its zenith to where it set in the west.

== See also ==
- Western Mexico shaft tomb tradition
- Los Guachimontones
- Voladores Ceremony
