= Guachimontones =

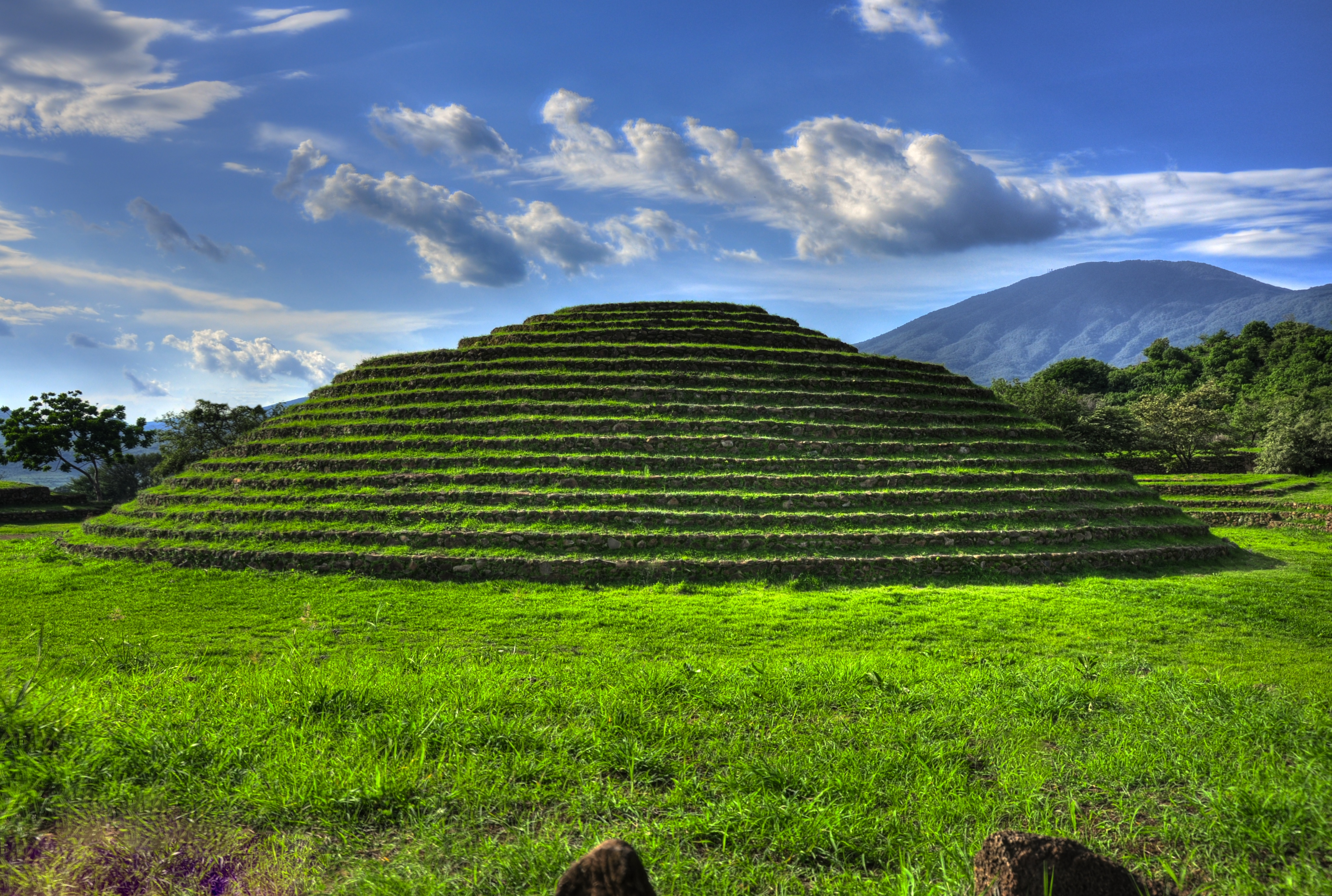
- "La Iguana" structure.

- Location within Mesoamerica
- 20°40′59.00″N 103°49′0.00″W
- Periods: Late Formative to Classic
- Cultures: Teuchitlán culture
- Location: Jalisco, Mexico
- Region: Jalisco

UNESCO World Heritage Site
- Official name: Agave Landscape and Ancient Industrial Facilities of Tequila
- Criteria: Cultural: ii, iv, v, vi
- Reference: 1209
- Inscription: 2006 (30th Session)

Los Guachimontones is the largest Late Formative to Classic period (300 BCE to 450/500 CE) pre-Columbian archaeological site in the state of Jalisco. Situated in the hills above the town of Teuchitlán that provides the namesake for the culture that built the site, Los Guachimontones is part of the Agave Landscape and Ancient Industrial Facilities of Tequila UNESCO world heritage site and a major tourist attraction within the Tequila Valleys.

Los Guachimontones is one of several dozen Teuchitlán Culture sites within the Tequila Valleys, though it is by far the largest site in terms of both the number and size of its ceremonial buildings. These buildings, called guachimontones (singular, guachimontón) after the site name, are bulls-eye shaped buildings consisting of several distinct architectural elements that constitute a whole structure. These unique buildings are found primarily in the Tequila Valleys with other examples found in northern Jalisco near Bolaños, Guanajuato to the east, and Colima to the south.

The Teuchitlán culture that built the site was one of several cultures in West Mexico during the Late Formative to Classic periods that participated in the shaft tomb tradition in which some, but not all, people were interred underground. Sometimes mortuary goods accompanied the deceased with objects such as ceramic vessels, hollow and solid figurines, shell ornaments, conch shell trumpets, jadeite, and ground stone objects.

While Los Guachimontones was founded in the Late Formative period, there is some evidence of a Middle Formative occupation suggesting some temporal continuity at the site. Major construction began in the Late Formative and continued into the Early Classic. Monumental construction appears to have tapered off in the Late Classic with a decline in population followed by a drastic decline in the Epiclassic. Population levels rebounded to their Early Classic levels in the Postclassic, but with no monumental construction at or near the site.

== UNESCO World Heritage List ==
UNESCO has added the whole region, including the nearby tequila distilleries, to its World Heritage List. Due to heavy looting, the site was also included on the 2008 World Monuments Watch list of 100 Most Endangered Sites.

== Research history ==
The earliest documentation of Los Guachimontones comes from Victorian artist Adela Breton. Breton traveled through the Tequila Valleys region in the 1890s. During her travels, near the town of San Marcos Breton documented a mound in the process of being destroyed that contained several burials, hollow ceramic figures, and shell ornaments. This mound was likely the central altar for a guachimonton, but with its complete destruction, we may never know exactly what the mound was. Breton continued east stopping at the town of Teuchitlán in which she documented the site of Los Guachimontones. Breton took three photographs of the site, created two sketch maps, and collected a number of obsidian artifacts from a Postclassic workshop. These materials are now stored at the Bristol City Museum and Art Gallery in Bristol, United Kingdom. Unfortunately, Breton did not publish her maps or photographs and the unique architectural form of the guachimontones went unnoticed for several decades until the late 1960s.

Following shortly after Breton, anthropologist Carl Lumholtz journeyed through the Tequila Valleys as part of his travels south from Phoenix, Arizona through the Sierra Madre Occidental to Michoacán. While Lumholtz did not record a visit to Los Guachimontones itself, did acquire ceramic vessels from the nearby town of Estanzuela to the southeast of Teuchitlán. Of some importance are the photos Lumholtz took of Laguna Magdalena showing the extent of some of its shoreline before the lake was largely drained in the 1930s to create arable land. Laguna Magdalena would have provided important lacustrine resources to the Teuchitlán culture in the form of fish, reeds, lake fowl, and other goods.

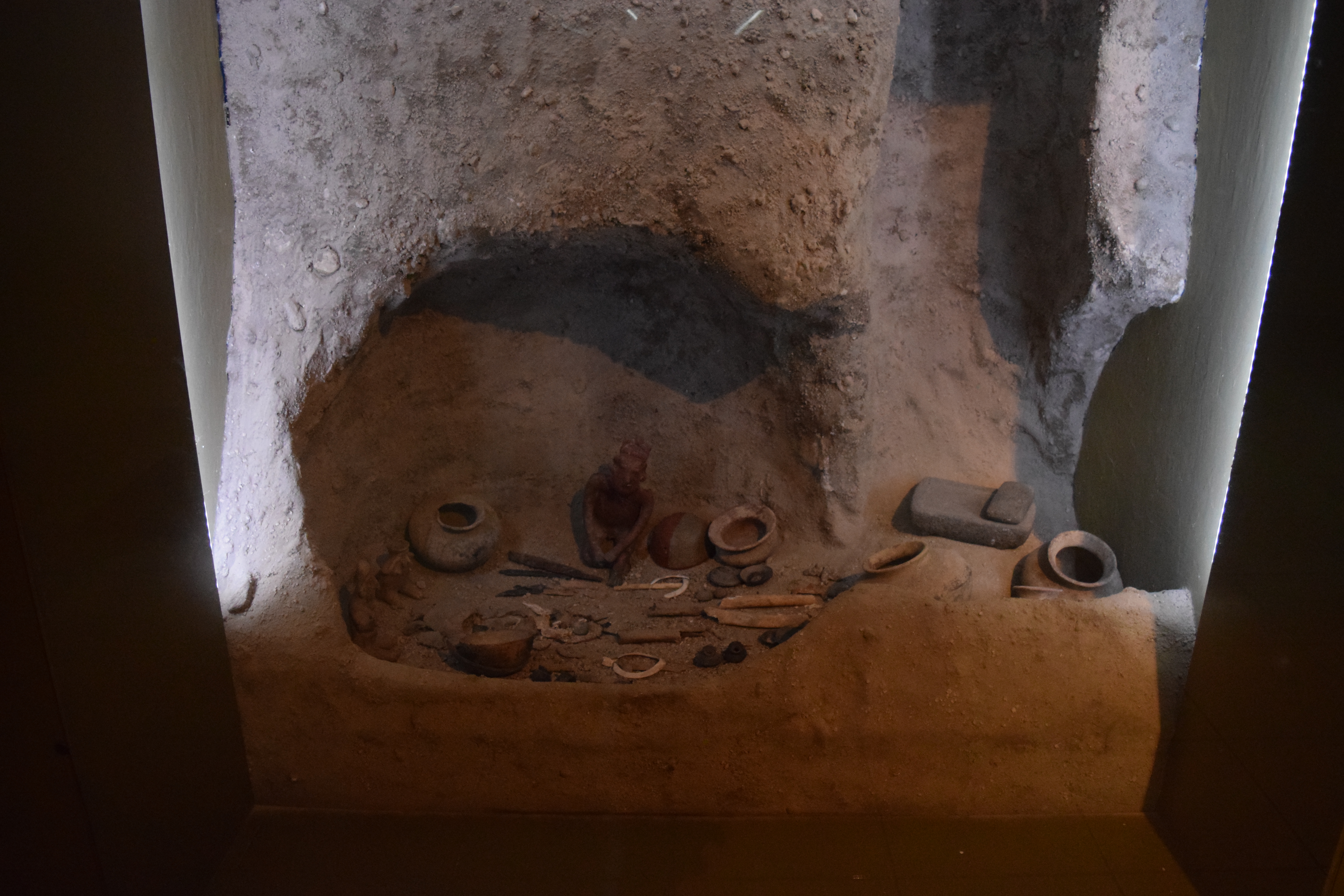
Recreation of a shaft and chamber tomb from the Casa de Cultura in Tala, Jalisco, Mexico

The guachimontón architectural form went undocumented by archaeologists for almost 70 years after Breton's journey through the area. Despite archaeological work conducted in the Magdalena Lake Basin by Jose Corona Nunez in the 1950s and Stanley Long in the 1960s at the sites of El Arenal and San Sebastian, the guachimontón went unrecognized. Not until 1974 with two publications, one by Phil Weigand and another by Joseph Mountjoy and Weigand, did the guachimonton form gain attention in Mesoamerican studies. Until Weigand's publication, other Mesoamerican academics characterized West Mexico as a region made of small hamlets with no significant contributions until the Postclassic period and rise of the Kingdom of Tzintzuntzan in present-day Michoacán. Weigand and Mountjoy formally mapped Los Guachimontones for the first time in 1974. This map included the two ceremonial centers at the site and a number of terraces and house mounds. Weigand continued working in the Tequila Valleys region for three decades documenting dozens of Teuchitlán Culture sites with guachimontones, Mesoamerican ballcourts, house mounds, and shaft and chamber tombs. It was not until 1999 and the Proyecto Arqueológico Teuchitlán (PAT) that Weigand began excavating Teuchitlán Culture sites, specifically the site of Los Guachimontones. However, other Teuchitlán Culture sites were excavated by other archaeologists, namely at Huitzilapa and the La Venta Corridor. Weigand noted that until relatively recently, a spring used to flow near the ceremonial center. People from the town of Teuchitlán used to bring people to this spring as part of a baptism ritual.

Weigand was director of PAT from 1999 to his death in 2011. After Weigand's death, Dr. Verenice Heredia Espinoza from El Colegio de Michoacán became the new director. Heredia continues to conduct research at the site with a focus on analyzing the substantial collection of artifacts recovered from Weigand's excavations.

== Site description ==
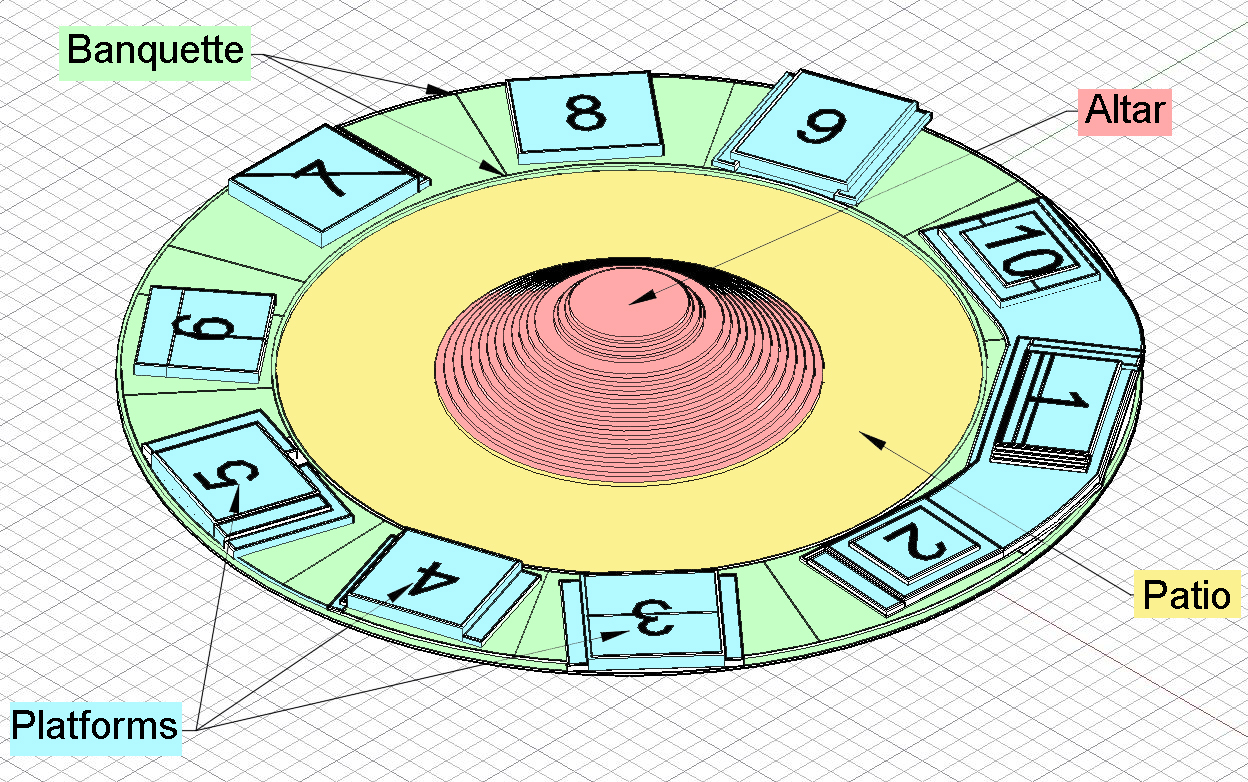
Color-coded schematic of a guachimonton indicating its various architectural features

The archaeological site boundaries of Los Guachimontones consist of two ceremonial areas, numerous house mounds, and terraced hillsides covering an area of approximately 19 hectares. However, remains of the site extend beyond the protected boundaries. The two ceremonial areas are Los Guachimontones, located on the hill slopes, and Loma Alta, located to the northeast on the hill top. Los Guachimontones consists of nine guachimontones, two ballcourts, a major and minor plaza, and numerous house mounds. Loma Alta consists of five guachimontones, one ball court, and one major plaza. Survey work from 2013 to 2017 has documented a total of twenty-five guachimontones within the protected boundaries of the site including the fourteen guachimontones at the two ceremonial centers.

A typical guachimontón (colloquially called a circle in both English and Spanish) consists of four basic architectural features: the patio, the banquette, the altar, and the platforms. The patio consists of a circular platform that forms the base of the building and dictates its maximum diameter. Constructed on top of the patio are both the banquette and the altar. The banquette consists of a ring-shaped platform whose outer diameter conforms to the diameter of the patio platform. The inner diameter of the banquette is set somewhere in the patio space dictating the size of the platforms and constraining the available patio space. Constructed in the center of the patio is the altar that exhibits a range of diameters, sizes, and shapes and constrains the available patio space. Typically, constructed on top of the banquette is an even number of quadrangular platforms ranging in number from four to sixteen. Variation in guachimonton form and orientation exists throughout the Tequila Valleys that makes understanding the structures, their meaning, and their use somewhat difficult to interpret.

Guachimontones are possibly an outgrowth of earlier Middle Formative burial mounds, such as the one documented near San Felipe by Weigand. These large, low mounds once contained dozens of burials before looters and construction activities destroyed these mounds. While burials typically are not found within the altars of a guachimonton, there may be some continuity in cosmological belief from the Middle Formative to Late Formative periods. Based on a limited number of excavations of guachimontones, the earliest dated guachimonton is that of Circle 1 and Circle 6 at Los Guachimontones. These two structures, despite their drastic difference in size, date to the Tequila II phase (300 to 100 BCE). Circle 6 is notable for containing several secondary burials within its altar, possibly part of a place-making ritual involving important ancestors.

== Site history ==
=== Middle Formative ===
The Middle Formative (or Tequila I phase) dates from 1000 to 300 BCE There is some evidence in the form of ceramic sherds for a Middle Formative occupation at the site at both ceremonial centers. However, the amount of sherds is not substantial. Construction activities leveled and shaped the hilltop sometime between the end of the Middle Formative and the beginning of the Late Formative period. This leveling removed potential stratigraphic layers showing more evidence an earlier occupation.

=== Late Formative ===
The Late Formative (or Tequila II phase) dates from 300 to 100 BCE This period is characterized by the construction of many of the larger monumental buildings like Circle 1 and Ball Court 1. Settlement survey and ceramic evidence suggests a growing population during this period as people settled near the center or made more permanent house platforms. Secondary burials were deposited at the smaller Circle 6, possibly part of a place-making activity involving the remains of important ancestors.

=== Early Classic ===
The Early Classic (or Tequila III phase) dates from 100 BCE to 200 CE This period is characterized by the continuing construction of guachimontones and ball courts, like Circles 2 and 3. During this period, the site reached its maximum population estimated between 3,690 and 9,225 people with a mean population of 6,458 based on settlement survey by Heredia Espinoza.

=== Late Classic ===
Late Classic (or Tequila IV phase) dates from 200 to 450/500 CE During this period, there is a drop in population levels at the site and currently the cause is uncertain. There is no new monumental construction and no notable offerings or elite burials have been excavated that date to this period.

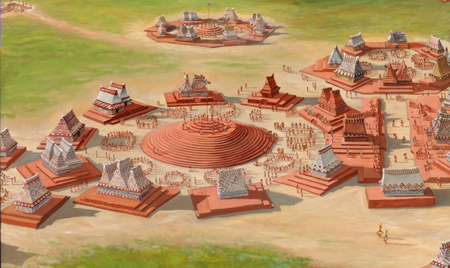
Artist recreation of Los Guachimontones. From Beekman and Pickering (2016)

=== Epiclassic ===
The Epiclassic period dates from 450/500 to 900 CE This period marks a drastic population decline at the site. Despite several burials and offerings found scattered throughout the ceremonial center, no Epiclassic additions were made to the existing architecture and no independently constructed monumental buildings were constructed elsewhere in the site. The dramatic change may be the result of the Tequila Valleys region receiving an influx of migrants from elsewhere, likely the Bajío region of Guanajuato. Contrary to common beliefs, this does not represent a “Toltec Invasion,” but the establishment of new communities from outside of the Tequila Valleys.

=== Postclassic ===
The Postclassic period dates from 900 to 1400 CE This period marks a return in population levels at the site to its estimated Classic period levels. However, there is no major construction period at the site during this period. Instead, “ranchos,” or small house groups, located on top of or nearby the abandoned ceremonial buildings, characterize the Postclassic period. Unlike the earlier Epiclassic period, the Postclassic people that now occupy the site made no offerings at the ceremonial buildings. Instead, they interred their dead and made their own offerings in other areas of the site like Talleres. The Talleres region of the site is located where the parking lot and the Interpretive Center are today. Household platforms, burials, and ovens characterized this area. One long lasting activity at Los Guachimontones during this period was the large obsidian workshop. Previously thought to date to the Late Formative to Classic period of site occupation, this large obsidian workshop dates to the later Postclassic period.

== Political structure ==
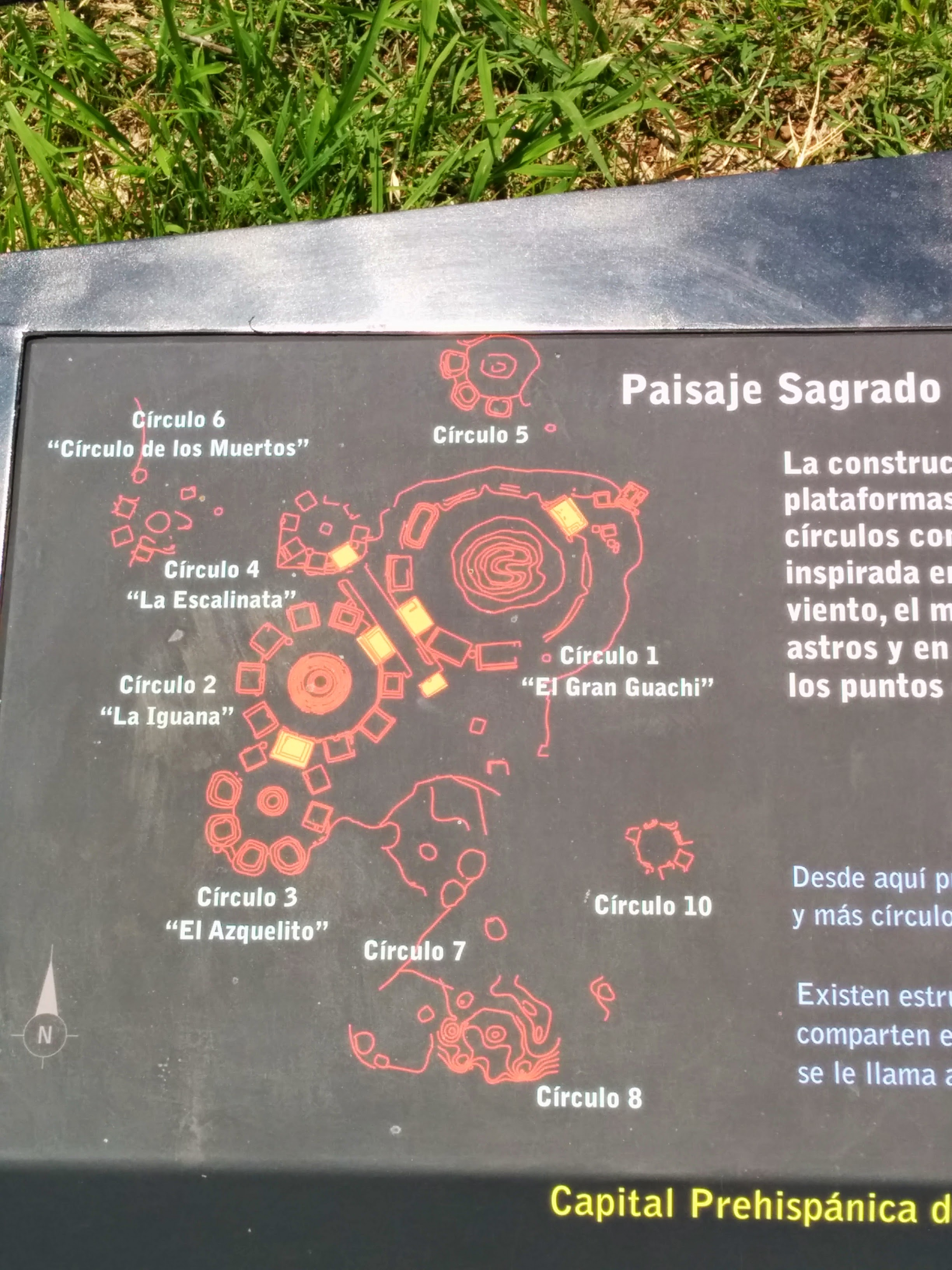
The map for the archaeology site of Los Guachimontones, Jalisco, Mexico

Three different political systems have been proposed for the Teuchitlán Culture with the site of Los Guachimontones having a role in all three systems. Phil Weigand and Christopher Beekman proposed the first in 1998 that consisted of a segmentary state model. In this model, there is a concentrated core and a broad surrounding hinterland. Within the core of the segmentary state, control is exerted through ceremonialism rather than political force. The Tequila Valleys constitute the core of this segmentary state based on the number of sites with guachimontones and the size of the guachimontones. Guachimontones located outside of the Tequila Valleys are then considered peripheral regions that exploited rare resources for the core. Within the segmentary state, Weigand argued a settlement hierarchy existed between the major sites in the region. Los Guachimontones was at the top of this proposed hierarchy. Smaller, but still large sites, like Ahaululco, Navajas, and Santa Quiteria, would have provided further administrative control over the region. Smaller sites were hypothesized act as loci for minor elite control or as a way to promote population cohesion.

Lorenza Lopez Mestas in 2011 proposed that the Teuchitlán Culture consisted of a collection of lineage or clan-based chiefdoms. In this model, each ceremonial center in the Tequila Valleys was the site of a chiefdom. These chiefdoms would have banded together in defense of the valleys but would have also engaged in conflict and trade with each other. Lopez Mestas argued the primary mechanism of power that chiefs relied upon was their ability to engage in trade for exotic or prestigious goods, like jadeite and shell, from outside of the Tequila Valleys. Chiefly power was not absolute, however, and was based upon consensus rather than coercion. Failing to perform their necessary duties could result in a loss of power. One mechanism to maintain power would have been feasting. Lopez Mestas suggests that elites would try to convince commoners to donate artisan goods or domestic surplus to increase chiefly wealth and status. With this newfound wealth and status, chiefs could then hold larger feasts and gain control over even more resources.

Beekman later proposed a new political structure for the Teuchitlán Culture. He suggested a model in which Teuchitlán Culture centers were ruled by corporate groups composed of multiple lineages, clans, or elite families. These corporate groups would have coopered together to form a broader collective governance. Beekman's model is based on his excavations at two smaller sites, Llano Grande and Navajas, and his examination of the architecture. Irregularities within the construction of these structures suggest that separate labor groups were employed for construction, specifically the platforms of the guachimonton. These differences likely indicate a form of competition and status signaling.

DeLuca tested this hypothesis of labor organization by quantifying the amount of labor that may have been utilized to construct Circle 2 at Los Guachimontones. An architectural energetics analysis of Circle 2 estimated that it would have taken 112,651.41 person-days to construct the entire building over six construction seasons. The large amount of person-days is the result of the abundant use of clay for construction material. The closest estimated source of clay for construction is about 1 kilometer away at the base of the hills Los Guachimontones is constructed upon. DeLuca noted that great differences in volume size, construction methods, and estimated construction labor for each of the ten platforms. This is in stark contrast to the relatively homogenous patio platform in which the other architectural features are built upon. The combined labor to build the platforms was insufficient to construct the other features of Circle 2. He suggested a dual model of labor organization to have utilized both the cooperation and competition aspects of Beekman's proposed model. Within this dual labor organization model, people came together under a labor collective free from elite lineage control to construct the laborious patio platform. After the patio was constructed, elites began to exert control over labor parties resulting in construction and labor variation within the banquette and platforms.

== Architecture meaning ==
Scholars have proposed several ideological or cosmological interpretations for the guachimontones. J. Charles Kelley was the first to suggest that the ceramic models looted from shaft and chamber tombs depicting one to four house structures and a pole in the center space with a person perched on top may be a depiction of a version of the volador ceremony practiced in Mexico today. Some of these models depict two poles, one straight, and one curved, perhaps as a way to indicate motion. Christopher Beekman expanded upon this idea several decades later to support the volador idea and to suggest practices could include other pole ceremonies known elsewhere from Mesoamerica. Kelley also suggested that the altar of a guachimonton might represent an artificial mountain, a cosmologically significant feature to Mesoamerican beliefs. Mountains were where the gods dwelt, where water flowed from, and where one could find caves to the underworld. Shaft and chamber tombs may represent artificial caves with their location underground. Together, tombs, guachimontones, and a pole ceremony, depicts the Mesoamerican cosmology of an underworld, an earthly plane, and the heavens.

Christopher Witmore interprets the form of the guachimonton, with the altar in the center and platforms arranged around the patio space, to represent the sun. Witmore draws upon Wixáritari (Huichol) ethnographic work to suggest that the guachimonton may be an ancient version of the contemporary Wixáritari tuki. He compares the structures to ideological concepts of the Wixáritari deities Grandfather Fire and Father Sun.

Alternatively, Christopher Beekman suggests that a typical eight platform guachimonton might represent eight-row maize, a variety of maize with its origins in West Mexico. If one cuts a maize cob in half, the eight kernels and cob core looks similar to that of a guachimonton. This association with maize may be linked to volador ceremonies or other Mesoamerican pole-related ceremonies, such as pole-climbing and green maize ceremonies.

In her dissertation, Butterwick sees guachimontones as places of ancestor worship and of feasting. Drawing upon excavation data from the site of Huitzilapa and looted ceramic models from tombs that depict simplified guachimontones, Butterwick argues that guachimontones may simply be four platform groups with a central ancestral shrine made larger. The ceramic models without a pole in their center often depict the spaces as a hub of activities from marriage ceremonies, to food preparation, to music making and dancing, and even warfare. The ceramics found at Huitzilapa tend to be of serving ware and their distribution suggests feasting was an important activity. A similar model is viable for Los Guachimontones despite its larger size and lack of documented elaborate shaft tombs.

== Summary of monumental buildings ==
=== Los Guachimontones ===
==== Circle 1 ====
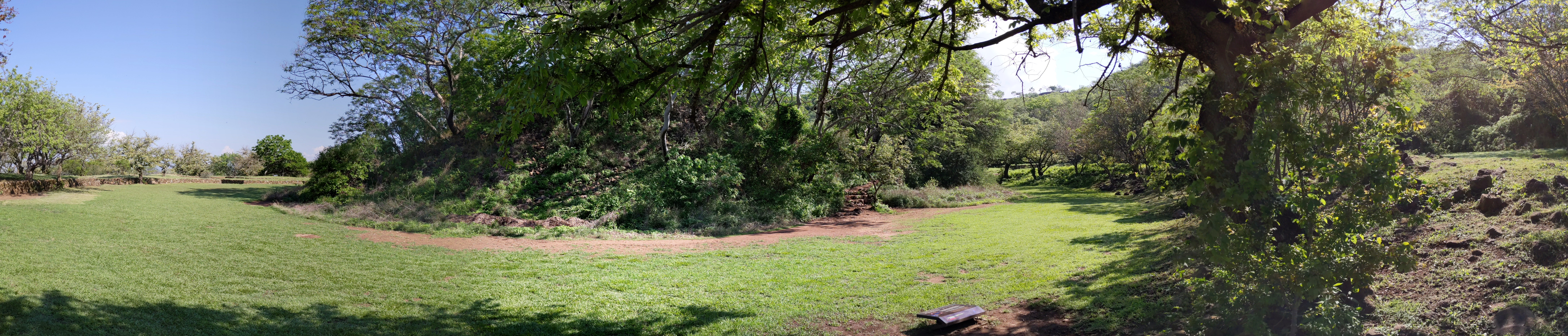
A panorama of Circle 1

Circle 1 is the largest guachimonton at the site and one of the earliest monumental buildings constructed. Radiocarbon and ceramic evidence suggest a construction date sometime between 160 and 40 BCE Circle 1 has an overall estimated diameter of 120 meters. Circle 1 is the only guachimonton at the site that has twelve platforms constructed on top of its banquette. Platform 1 is situated on the southwestern section of the banquette is centered on Ball Court 1. Due to destruction resulting from modern farming practices, Circle 1 is less preserved than some of the other guachimontones and as a result only a portion of its platforms have been restored. The altar of Circle 1 once had a deep looter's pit, which has been filled and stabilized.

==== Circle 2 ====
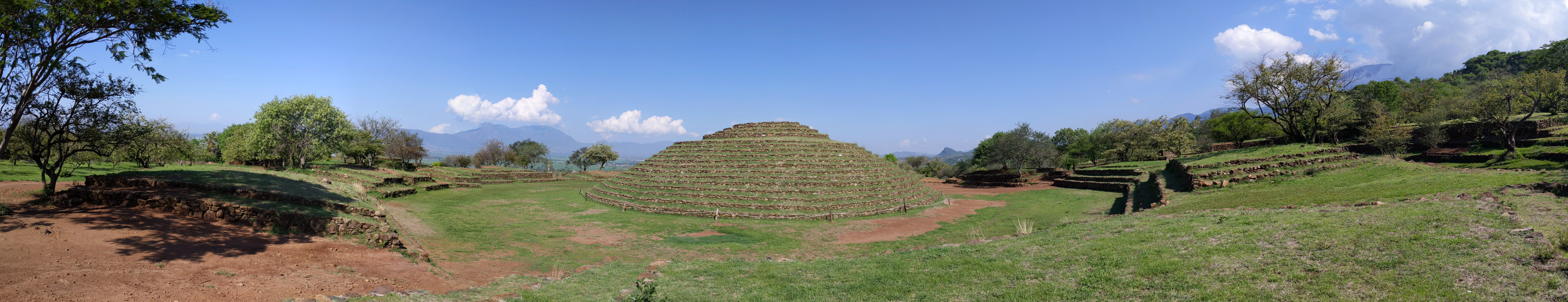
A panorama of Circle 2

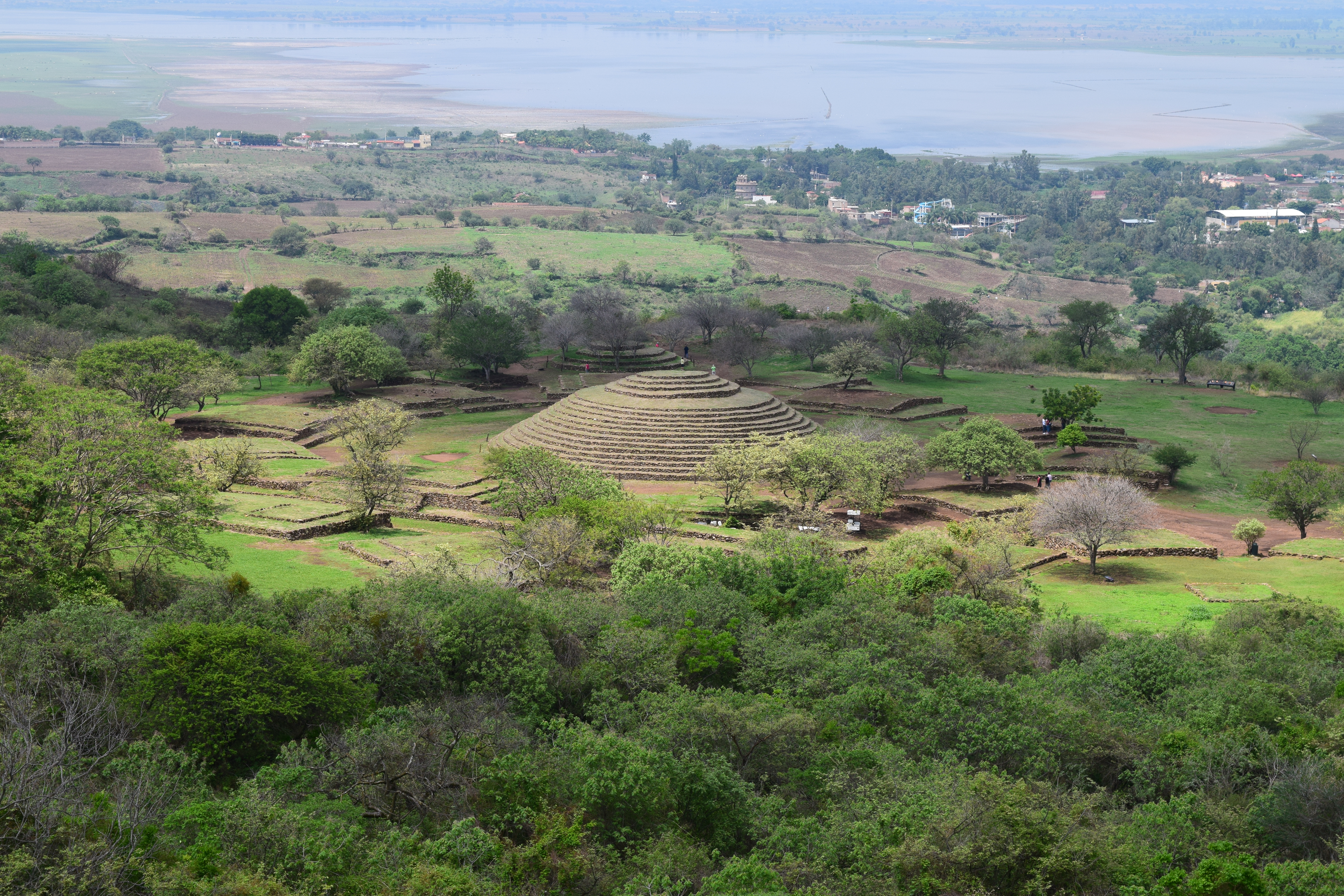
A view of Circle 2 from atop a nearby hill

Circle 2 is the second largest guachimonton with an overall diameter estimated at 100 meters. The central altar has an estimated diameter of 99 meters. Circle 2 is the only at the site to have ten platforms constructed on its banquette. Radiocarbon and ceramic evidence suggest a construction date sometime between 15 and 115 CE Platform 1, the largest of the ten platforms, is situated on the northeast portion of the banquette and is centered on Ball Court 1. Platform 5, in the southwest portion of Circle 2, is unique among the platforms at the lower ceremonial center as it is the only platform shared between two guachimontones. The other guachimonton that shares Platform 5 is Circle 3. Oliver Flores has proposed that Altar C2 contains geometric alignments that make up the structure of a functional 52-year Mesoamerican calendar system.

==== Ball Court 1 ====
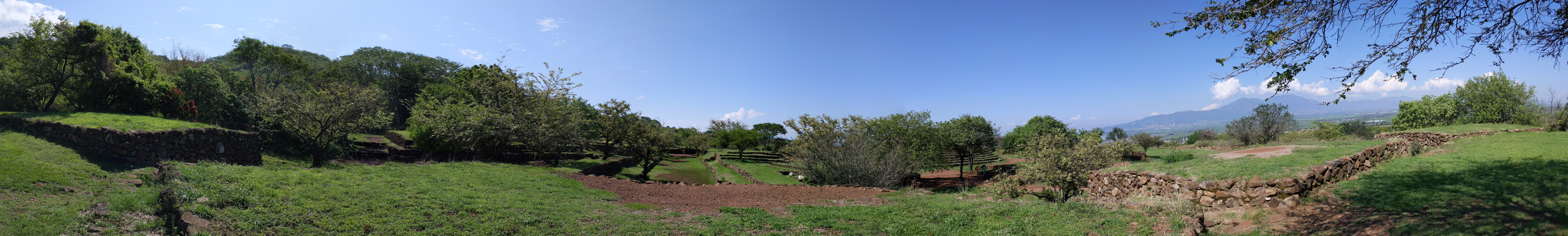
A panorama of Ball Court 1

Ball Court 1 has an overall length of 110 meters. Unlike other Mesoamerican ball courts, Ball Court 1 does not have sloping slides. Instead, like other ball courts in the Tequila Valleys region, the sides of the lateral platforms were straight. Due to its length and lack of sloping sides, there are questions as to what style of the Mesoamerican ballgame that the Teuchitlán Culture would have played. Regional variation existed across Mesoamerica from the time of contact and into the past.

Radiocarbon, ceramic, and excavation data indicate that Ball Court 1 was constructed between 160 and 100 BCE after the construction of Circle 1, but before the construction of Circle 2. Ball Court 1 initially was constructed to a length of 60 meters and later expanded towards Circle 4. It is possible that Ball Court 1's expansion was to accommodate the later construction of Circle 4. However, its initial construction length would not have resulted in a centered placement between Circles 1 and 2 making it an asymmetrical construction in an otherwise symmetrically focused site.

==== Circle 3 ====
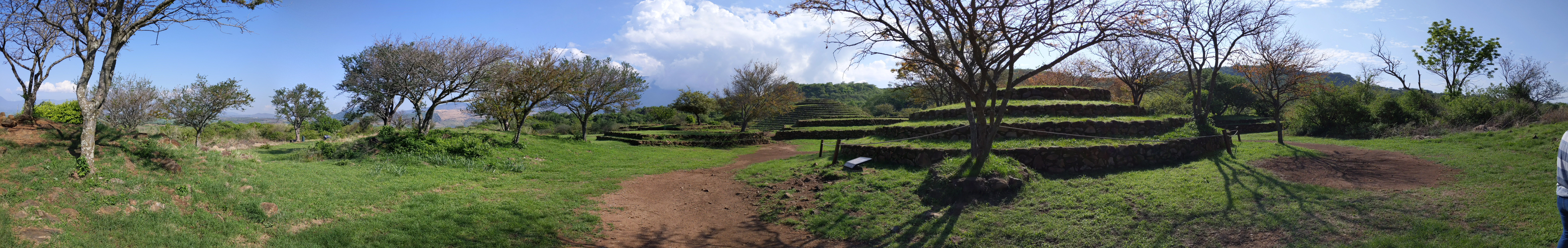
A panorama of Circle 3

Circle 3 is unique at Los Guachimontones being only one of a handful of guachimontones in the region that is connected to another guachimonton via a shared platform. Platform 5, having been constructed to be part of Circle 2 much earlier than Circle 3, is disproportionately larger than Circle 3's other platforms. Circle 3's overall diameter is 70 meters and has eight platforms. Radiocarbon and ceramic evidence suggest a construction date between 80 and 220 CE Circle 3 is also unique for a nearby small plaza space just to the south of the structure. Within this plaza space, four small shaft tombs were discovered three of which contained the remains of people while the fourth contained the remains of a dog. These were not elaborate shaft tomb burials as compared to the burials documented at San Sebastian, El Arenal, or Huitzilapa, but rather simple burials consisting of some shell jewelry and ceramic vessels.

==== Circle 4 ====
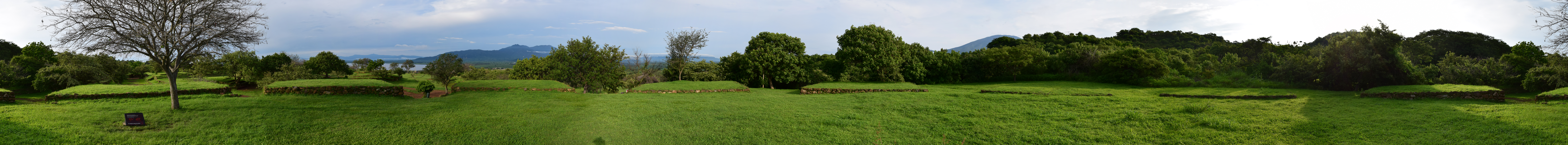
A panorama of Circle 4

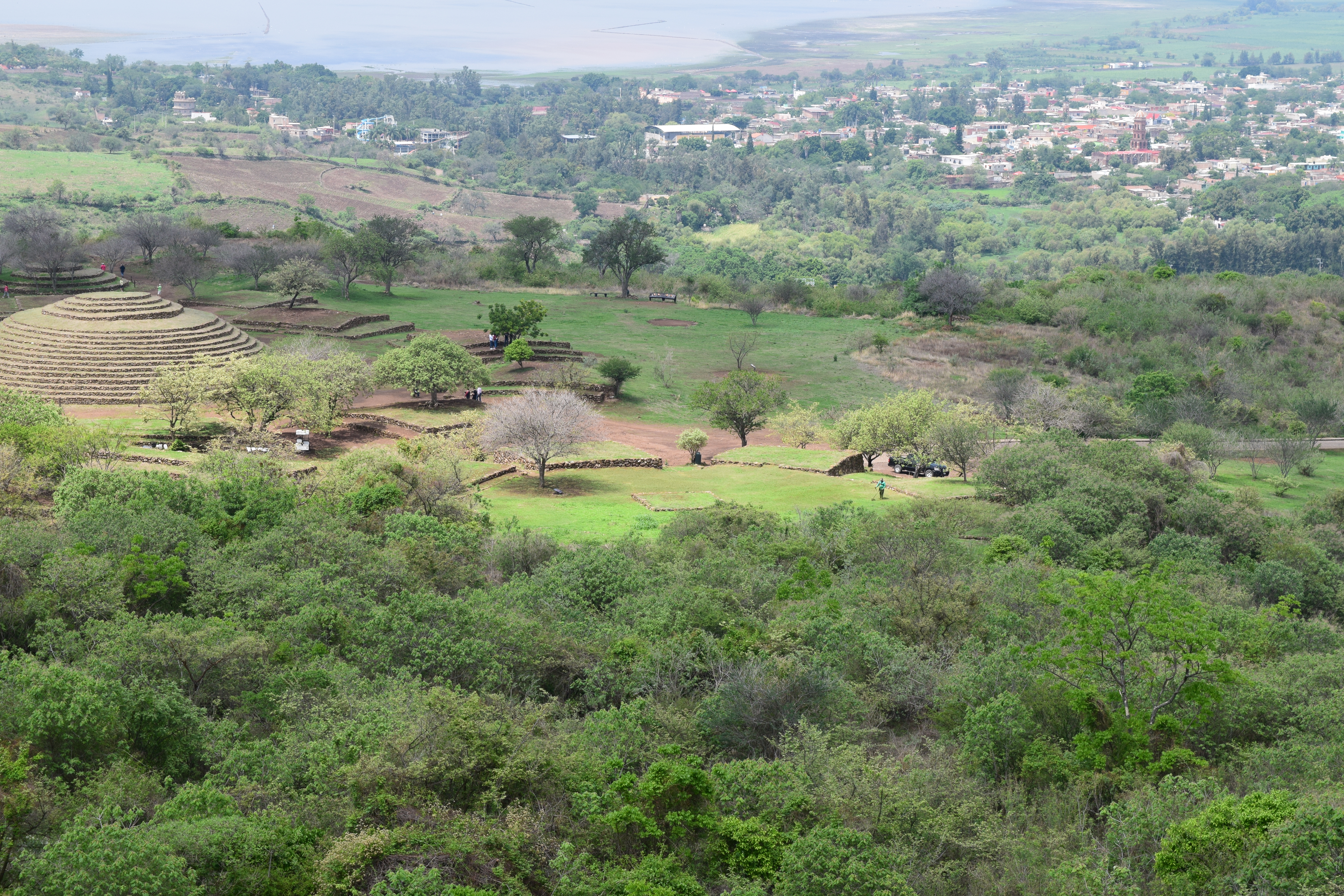
A view of Circle 4 from atop a nearby hill

Circle 4 is situated to the northwest of Circles 1 and 2 and Ball Court 1. Circle 4's construction dates between 40 BCE and 220 CE Circle 4 is unique within the lower ceremonial center in that one of Circle 4's platforms is the north platform for Ball Court 1. In 1999, when Weigand first began excavating Los Guachimontones, a road once existed between Circle 4 and the long lateral platforms of Ball Court 1 resulting in heavy damage to both the guachimonton and the ball court. As a result, the platform that is a part of Ball Court 1 is heavily reconstructed. Circle 4's overall diameter is 55 meters with a 7-meter diameter altar and eight platforms. Circle 4 is also unusual in that the altar of the guachimonton is square rather than circular. Excavations indicate that the altar was constructed at the same time as the rest of Circle 4 and is not a later period addition.

==== Circles 5, 7, 8, and 10 ====
These four circles are scattered around the main ceremonial center and are smaller in size. These four guachimontones were not excavated as heavily as the others and thus were not restored. Due to their smaller size, many of the guachimontones were heavily destroyed as a result of farming activities. The platforms for Circle 10, for example, are missing their top half likely due to mechanized plowing. These guachimontones are currently not accessible to the public.

==== Circle 6 ====
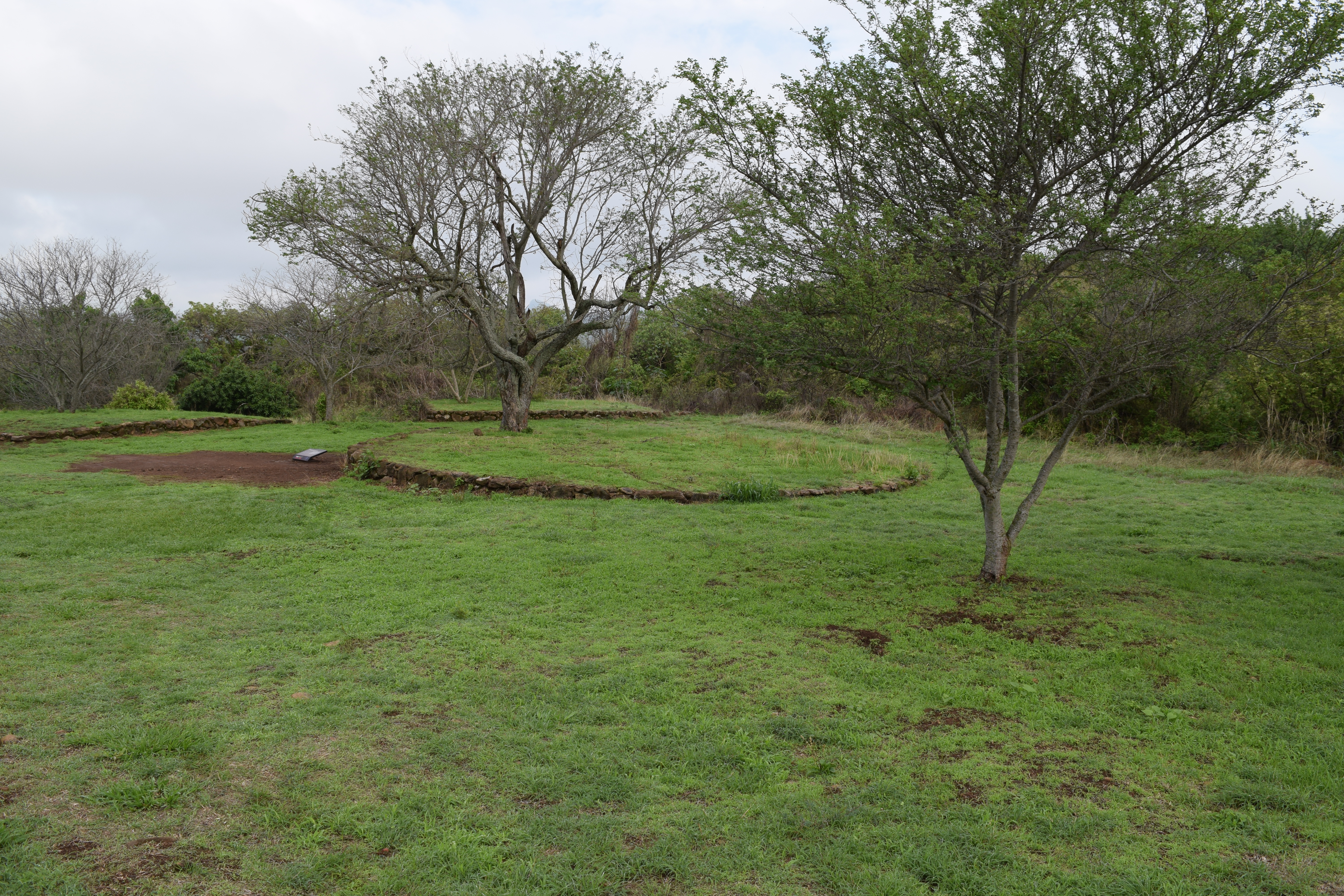
A view of Circle 6

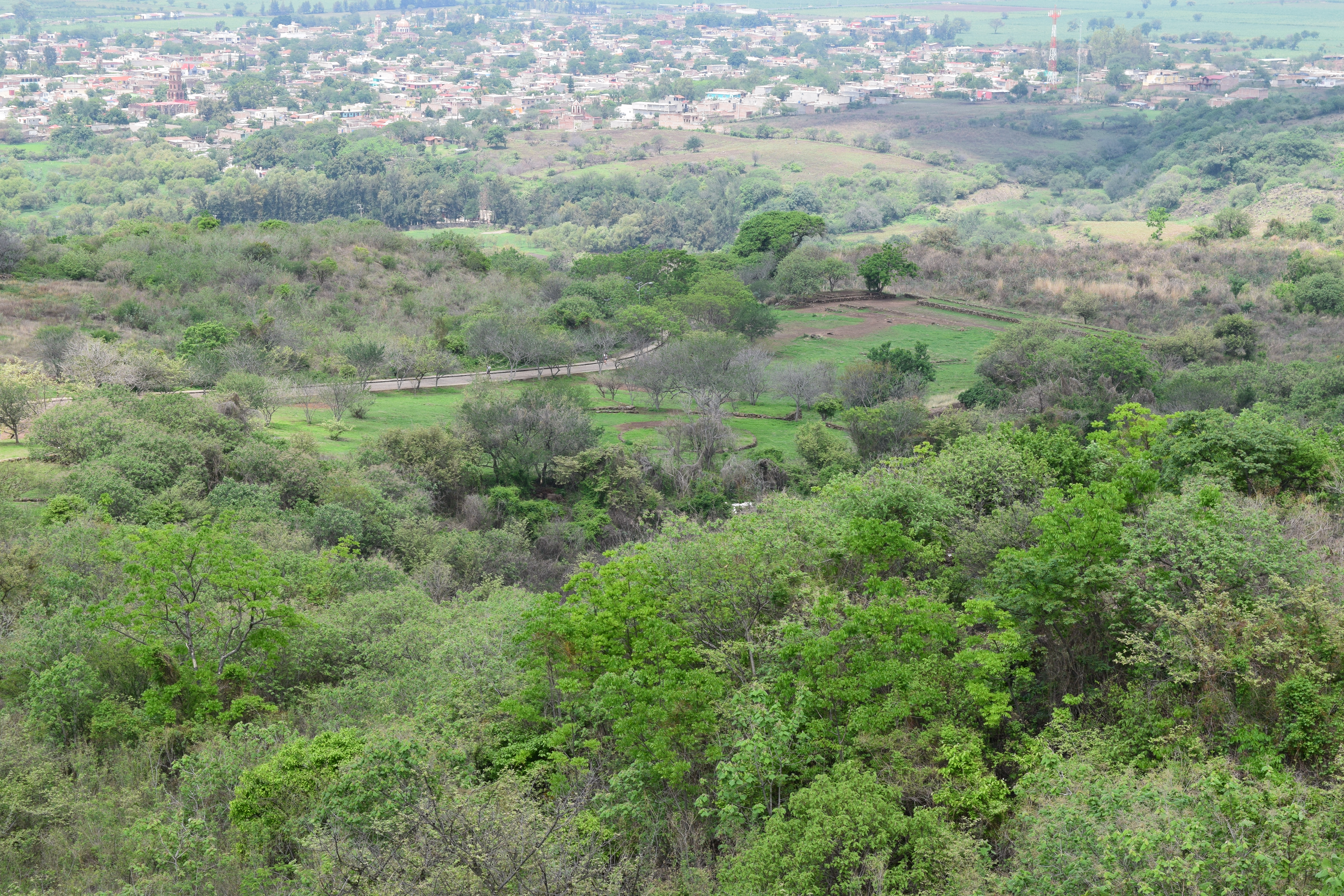
A view of Circle 6 from atop a nearby hill

Circle 6 is located partway between Ball Court 2 and Circle 4. Heavy damage prevents an accurate estimate of its overall diameter; however, it is comparable to Circle 4. Circle 6 likely had eight platforms in the past based on the number and distribution of the platforms that have survived. Despite heavy damage resulting from mechanized farming, several platforms and the altar were excavated and restored. Radiocarbon and ceramic data indicate that Circle 6 was constructed sometime between 160 and 100 BCE making it contemporaneous with the much larger Circle 1. The contrast in size is juxtaposed against the number of burials found within Circle 6's altar. Five burials, four offerings, and a small shaft tomb arrayed in a quincunx emphasize the symbolic and social importance of this space. Circle 6's importance continued into the Epiclassic with a number of burials found within the patio space and several offerings arranged in a line facing one platform.

==== Ball Court 2 ====
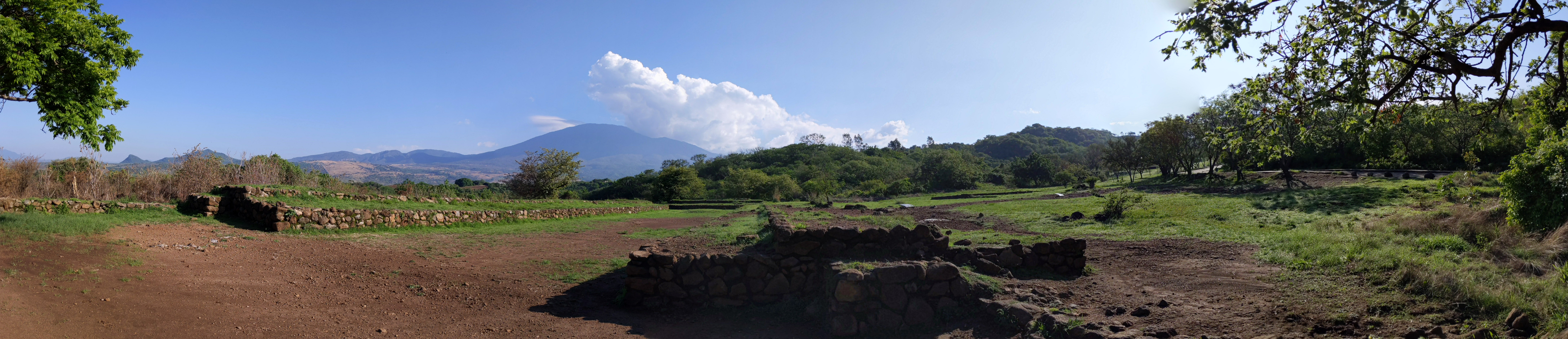
A panorama of Ball Court 2

Ball Court 2 is the second largest ball court at the site and located downslope from the main ceremonial center. Ball Court 2 has an overall length of 81 meters and a height of 1.1 meters. Ball Court 2 does not share the same orientation as Ball Court 1 and may be the result of temporal differences. A small platform is located in the north end of the playing space of Ball Court 2 that dates to the Epiclassic and Postclassic periods. Small mounds around Ball Court 2 date to the same period indicating a reuse of the space by subsequent periods for different uses.

=== Loma Alta ===
==== Circle A ====
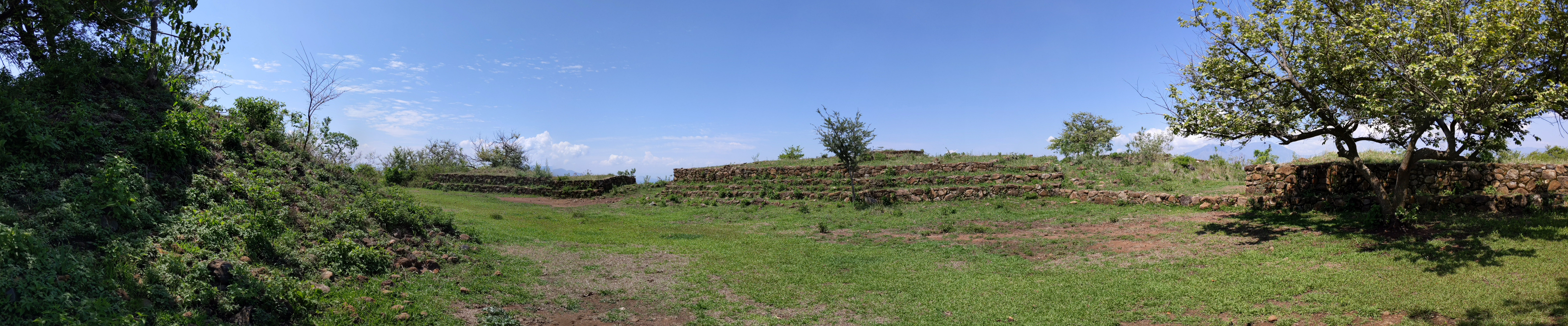
A panorama of Circle A at the site of Loma Alta/Los Guachimontones, Jalisco, Mexico

Circle A is the largest guachimonton at Loma Alta with an overall diameter of 80 meters and has eight platforms. Circle A dates from 60 BCE to 15 CE. Only a portion of Circle A was excavated and restored because part of the structure is on private property outside the archaeological site boundaries. One of Circle A's platforms forms the end platform for Loma Alta's ball court. Another platform is shared between Circles A and B. Circle A is somewhat lopsided, possibly because of constructing the guachimonton after the ball court on the narrow hilltop ridge.

==== Circle B ====
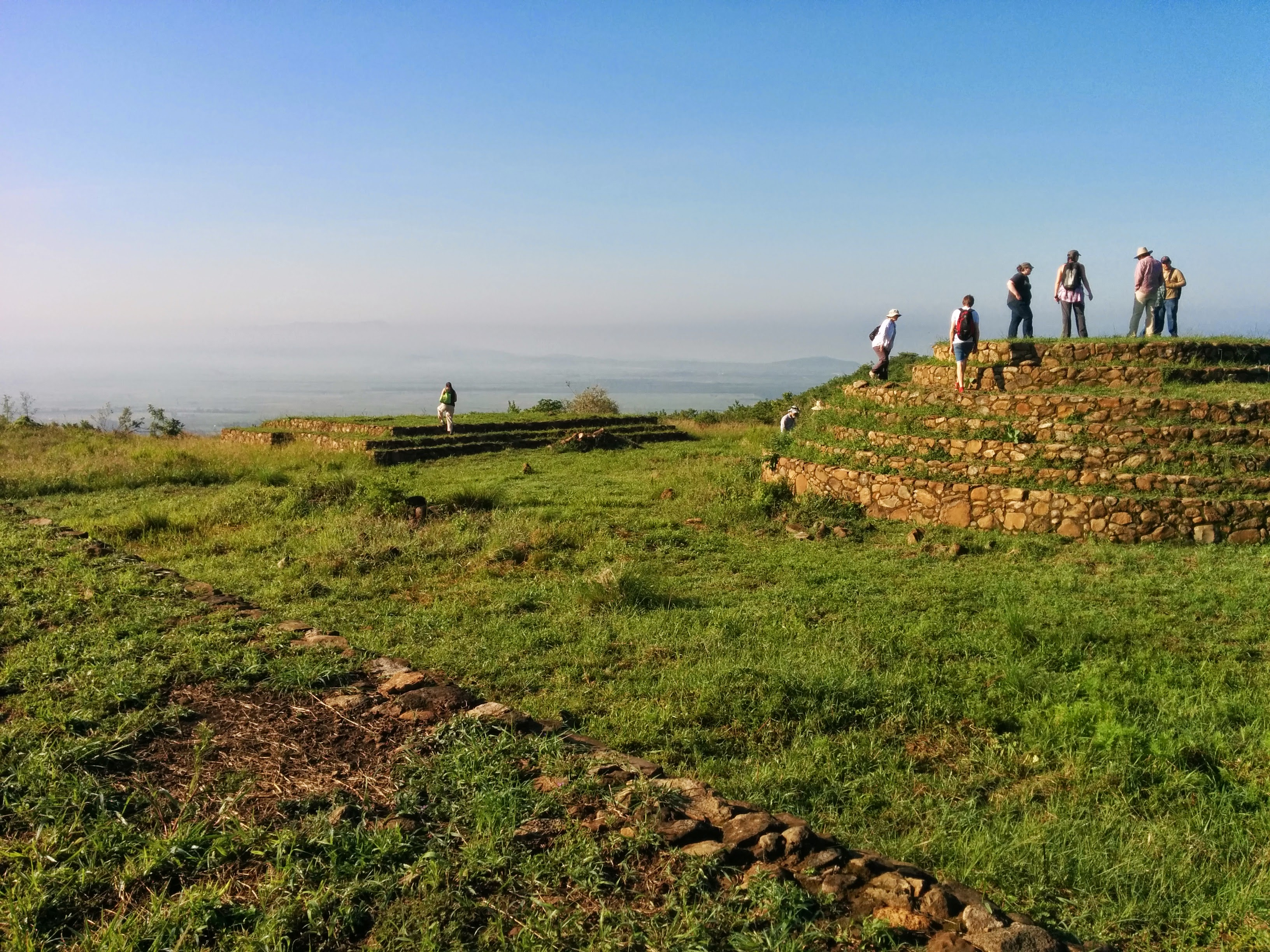
A view of Circle B at the site of Loma Alta/Los Guachimontones, Jalisco, Mexico

Circle B is the smaller of the two guachimontones excavated at Loma Alta. Circle B has an overall diameter of 60 meters. The construction of Circle B dates from 60 to 130 CE. Circle B has only four platforms, but the presence of an altar sets it apart from Plaza IV. Circle B is also lopsided, likely a result of constructing the guachimonton after the ball court and Circle A whilst being constrained by the narrow hilltop ridge. One of Circle B's platforms is shared with Circle A.

==== Ball Court 1 ====
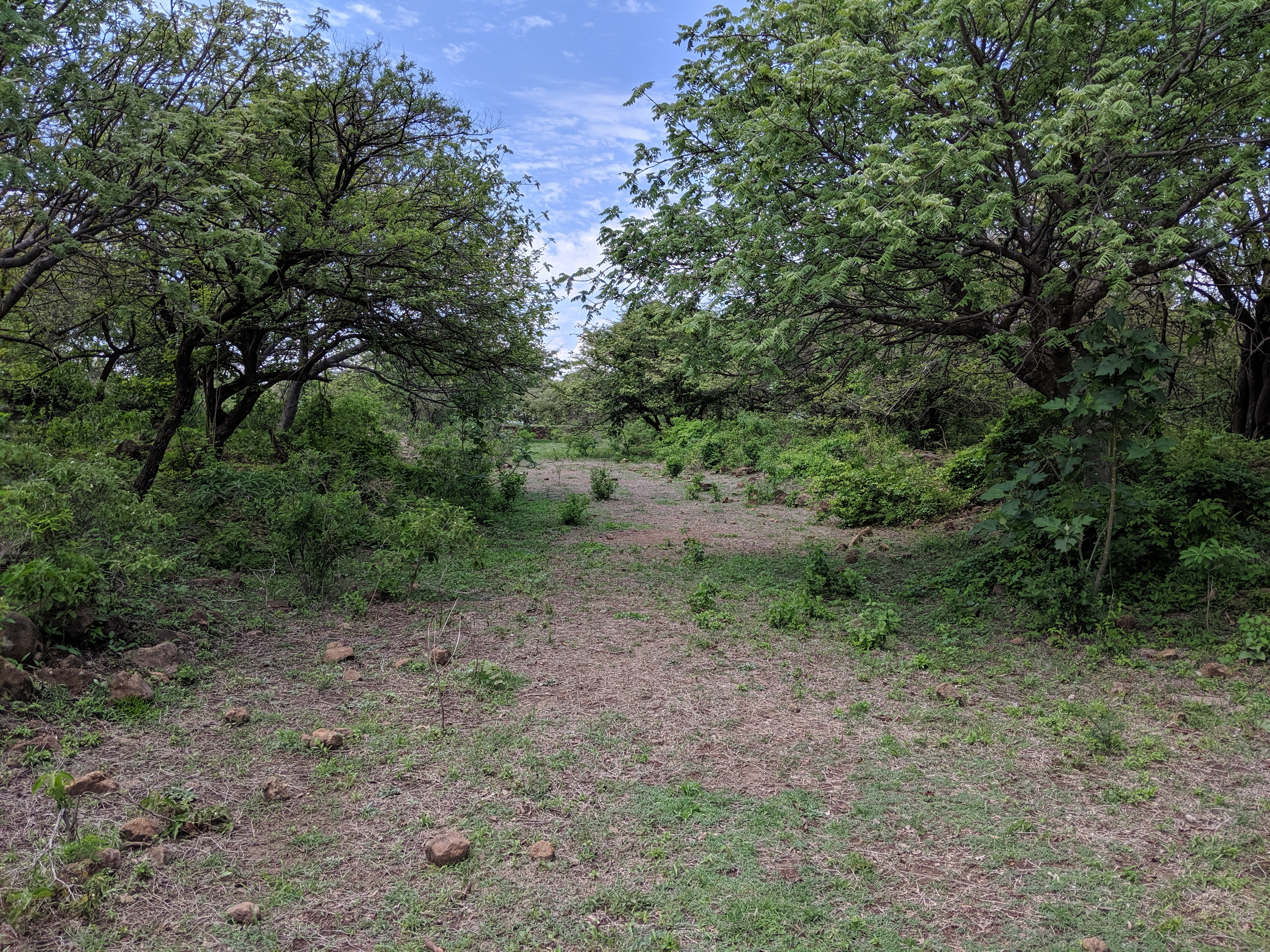
A view of Ball Court 1 at the site of Loma Alta/Los Guachimontones, Jalisco, Mexico

Because Ball Court 1 is located on private property, this feature was only briefly tested with permission from the landowner. As a result, the ball court remains unrestored and not open to visitors. Ball Court 1 awkwardly attaches to Circle A and the reasons for this are unclear. Unlike Circle B, the ridge top does not constrain the ball court's construction. This could be a result of Ball Court 1 predating Circle A. Loma Alta's ball court shares the same orientation as Los Guachimontones’ ball court suggesting that both were constructed around the same time.

==== Plaza IV ====
Plaza IV is the name given to an arrangement of four platforms to the south of Circle B. These platforms are quite large and vary in size. Plaza IV is not a guachimonton because there is no altar or post hole located in the center of the space and the platforms are not constructed upon a basal patio platform. Instead, it has been suggested that perhaps Plaza IV may constitute some kind of elite residence or space at Loma Alta.

== Art ==
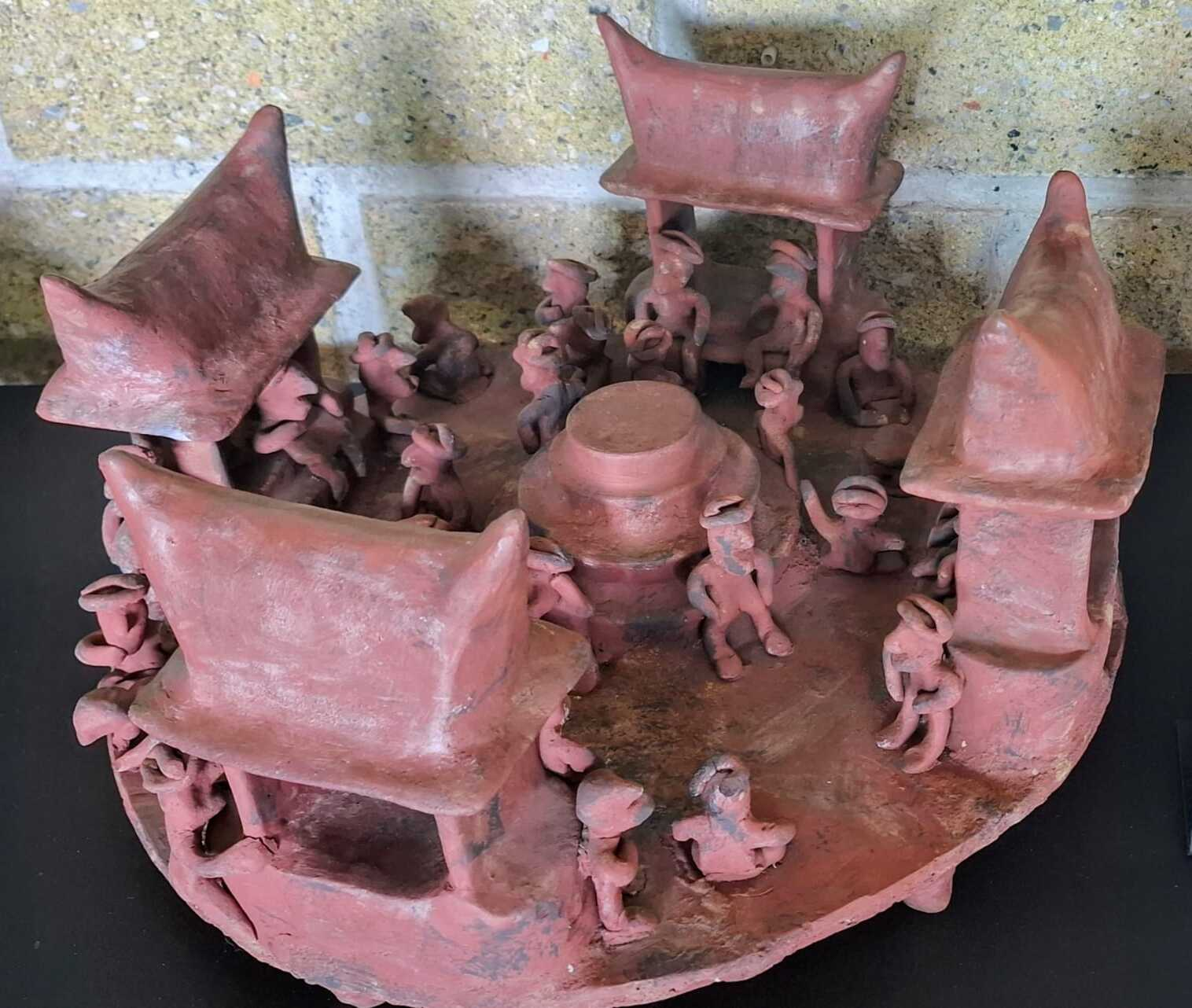
Guachimontones museum display

The art at Los Guachimontones is expressed primarily through ceramic, shell, and obsidian objects. Ceramic vessels come in a variety of styles with the most notable being Oconahua Red-on-White vessels with its characteristic red geometric pattern on a white background. While patterns tend to be geometric in design, there are some rare examples of animal depictions. The most common motif is that of the serpent, which may be related to broader Mesoamerican cosmology.

Like many cultures in West Mexico during this time period, the Teuchitlán culture created hollow ceramic figures and solid ceramic figurines. These figures are often characterized as shaft tomb figures due to their tangled history of being mortuary goods primarily found by looters in shaft and chamber tombs. However, excavations at Los Guachimontones have recovered figurines in non-mortuary contexts in sufficient quantities to question the “shaft tomb figure” label. Like several of the ceramic figures found within the tomb at Huitzilapa, these figures have use-wear and are often broken indicating that they had lives of their own outside of a mortuary context. The ceramic figures were not created to be buried; rather, they often ended up in burials along with other offerings. The ceramic figures tend to be characterized according to styles based on excavated and looted contexts. The figurine styles found at Los Guachimontones tend to be of the Ameca-Eztatlan and San Juanito figure styles.

== See also ==
- Western Mexico shaft tomb tradition
- Teuchitlán Culture
- Voladores Ceremony
