= Olmec influences on Mesoamerican cultures =

The causes and degree of Olmec influences on Mesoamerican cultures has been a subject of debate over many decades. Although the Olmecs are considered to be perhaps the earliest Mesoamerican civilization, there are questions concerning how and how much the Olmecs influenced cultures outside the Olmec heartland. This debate is succinctly, if simplistically, framed by the title of a 2005 The New York Times article: “Mother Culture, or Only a Sister?”.

== Olmec heartland ==
Nearly all researchers agree on a number of specific issues concerning the Olmec and the Olmec Heartland:

- The forebears of the Olmecs were indigenous to the Olmec heartland, and developed their civilization independent of other civilizations.
- The Olmec civilization arose in the Olmec heartland with the flowering of San Lorenzo Tenochtitlán in the centuries before 1200 BCE.

== Beyond the heartland ==
While some of the hallmarks of Olmec culture, such as colossal heads or other sculptures, earthen platforms, and monolithic "altars", are to be found only within the heartland, many Olmec-style artifacts, designs, figurines, monuments, and motifs can be found in the archaeological records of sites hundreds of kilometers/miles distant. The most prominent of these sites are:

- Tlatilco and Tlapacoya, major centers of the Tlatilco culture in the Valley of Mexico, where artifacts include hollow baby-face motif figurines and Olmec designs on ceramics.
- Chalcatzingo, in the Valley of Morelos, which features Olmec-style reliefs on monuments and exposed rock.
- Teopantecuanitlan, in Guerrero, which also features Olmec-style reliefs as well as city plans with distinctive Olmec features.
- San José Mogote, in Oaxaca, which features Olmec-style pottery. San Jose Mogote is, like the larger Olmec site of La Venta, oriented 8° west of north.

Other sites showing Olmec influence include Takalik Abaj and Monte Alto in Guatemala, Las Bocas in Puebla, and Zazacatla. In all these cases, the archaeological record shows Olmec-influenced objects existing alongside objects in the local tradition. Often, for example at Las Bocas, Olmec inconography will even appear on objects created in the local tradition.

The Olmec influences in these sites all post-date San Lorenzo and the cultural pathways almost exclusively flow from the Olmec heartland to these distant sites, and not in the other direction (from, say, Chalcatzingo to San Lorenzo Tenochtitlan). This apparent one-way flow has led most researchers to declare Olmecs to be the "mother culture" of Mesoamerica.

To quote perhaps the most prominent of Mesoamerican archaeologists, Michael D. Coe, "There is now little doubt that all later civilizations in Mesoamerica, whether Mexican or Maya, ultimately rest on an Olmec base." To this, Coe's student archaeologist Richard Diehl adds "While not every archaeologist agrees with Coe, ... mounting evidence ... has convinced everyone but the most die-hard opponents".

The major Formative Period sites in present-day Mexico which show Olmec influences in the archaeological record.

=== Mother culture ===
The concept of the Olmecs as a mother culture was first formally raised by Alfonso Caso at a 1942 conference on the "Olmec problem" in Tuxtla Gutiérrez where he argued that the Olmec were the "cultura madre" of Mesoamerica.

The proponents of the "mother culture" do not argue that the Olmec were the only contributors, but that the Olmecs first developed many of the features adopted by later Mesoamerican civilizations.

They argue that it was in San Lorenzo and the Olmec heartland that the hallmarks of the Olmec culture were first established, hallmarks that include the patio/plaza concept, monumental sculpture, Olmec iconography, archetypical Olmec figurines, and other portable art.

=== Sister culture ===
The "sister culture" proponents, on the other hand, state that Mesoamerican cultures evolved more or less simultaneously. Major proponents of this theory include Joyce Marcus and Kent V. Flannery, who argue that the Olmec were merely the first among equals, rather than the wellspring of cultural change.

"It is the adaptive autonomy and frequent competitive interaction of such chiefdoms that speed up evolution and eventually make useful technologies and sociopolitical strategies available to all regions.".

In a subsequent paper, they imply, for example, that Olmec iconography may have originated in the early Tlatilco culture.

This viewpoint is echoed by a minority of other researchers including art historian Caterina Magni who nonetheless agrees that the Olmecs bequeathed a rich heritage to later cultures. However, Magni does not agree that what is presently labelled as Olmec culture was first and foremost the product of the heartland.

"Contrary to [this] generally accepted idea, the brilliant [Olmec] culture did not originate in the Gulf coast of Veracruz and Tabasco. In truth, the varied and voluminous archaeological data shows a much more complex reality; [instead] Olmec religious and political centers emerged simultaneously throughout a vast part of Mesoamerica: from Mexico to Costa Rica."

Magni attributes these concepts to noted archaeologist Christine Niederberger.

=== Olmec-style pottery analysis ===
In an effort to address questions concerning the geographic origins of Olmec artifacts — with implications concerning the geographic origins of Olmec culture — in March 2005 a team of archaeologists used instrumental neutron activation analysis (INAA) to compare over 1,000 Mesoamerican Olmec-style ceramic artifacts with 275 samples of clay so as to "fingerprint" the origin of that pottery. They found that "the Olmec packaged and exported their beliefs throughout the region in the form of specialized ceramic designs and forms, which quickly became hallmarks of elite status in various regions of ancient Mexico".

In August 2005 the results of another study were published. This study used petrography to analyze 20 pottery shards, and found that five of the samples from San Lorenzo were "unambiguously" from Oaxaca. Based on this evidence, the authors concluded that the "exchanges of vessels between highland and lowland chiefly centers were reciprocal, or two way" which "contradicts recent claims that the Gulf Coast was the sole source of pottery" in Mesoamerica.

The results of the INAA study were later defended in March 2006 in two articles in Latin American Antiquity, in particular contrasting the sample size of the INAA study (roughly 1000) with the sample size of the petrography analysis (20).

=== An emerging middle ground ===
In the early 21st century it seems that a middle ground between the mother and sister culture positions may be emerging. Pool (2007) thus concludes that while San Lorenzo emerged early as the largest the most developed polity of Mesoamerica and the earliest evidence of several of the defining traits of Mesoamerican culture is found there, the Olmecs emerge looking less like a mother culture than as a promiscuous father culture spawning offspring generously with many different mothercultures all over mesoamerica. This formulation emphasises the viewpoint that influence from the Olmec heartland merged with many local traditions creating local expressions with both Olmec and non-Olmec roots. it follows from this approach that the type and degree of Olmec influence varies greatly from location to location within Mesoamerica.

== Flow of influence ==
If Olmec influences flowed out of the heartland in what is generally seen as a less than bilateral transfer, then how did this happen? How were the hallmarks of Olmec culture transmitted to sites hundreds of kilometers/miles distant from the heartland? Many theories have been advanced including:

- Olmec military domination,
- Olmec colonization of other regions,
- Olmec artisans travelling to other centers,
- Missionary activity,
- Conscious imitation of Olmec art styles by developing towns,
- Long-range trade by Olmec merchants.

There is little or no evidence to support Olmec military domination. Very little Olmec or other Early Formative era art shows war or sacrifice. No stelae have been found extolling rulers' victories, unlike the later Maya or the contemporaneous Egyptian or Hittite cultures.

Olmec colonization, that is the founding of new settlements by Olmec emigrants outside of the Olmec heartland, is unlikely. The archaeological records of Olmec-influenced sites show that each had pre-Olmec occupations as well as a significant number of indigenous artifacts created in a local tradition. The Tlatilco site as well as Xochipala figurines are two examples famous for a large number of figurines, which are unlike any found at La Venta or San Lorenzo.

Although portable art, such as pottery, celts, or other items could have been transported the long distances between towns, the monumental art at Chalcatzingo or Teopantecuanitlan would need to be created locally. Therefore, it is very likely that sculptors and artists familiar with or experienced in heartland architecture were commissioned to create similar ceremonial sites far from the heartland. But while this can explain how monumental Olmec-style art was created at Chalcatzingo, it does not explain why.

=== Long-distance trade ===
Similarly long-distance trade can explain the Olmec-style artifacts found in Teopantecuanitlan, as well the jade and obsidian artifacts found in the Olmec heartland, which is far from any jade or obsidian source. But trade by itself fails to explain the widespread adoption of Olmec-influenced artifacts and styles throughout Mesoamerica or Olmec iconography found on locally produced wares — while trade can explain the movement of objects, it does not explain the movement of ideas or styles. Therefore, according to archaeologist Jeffrey Blomster, "we have to move beyond a purely economic model . . . The fact that trade involves ceramic vessels which display iconography, representing an underlying ideology and religion synthesized by the Gulf Coast Olmec, suggests that something much deeper is at stake than simply maintaining exchange relationships."

The Olmec-influenced Painting 1 from the Juxtlahuaca cave, roughly 500 km (300 mi) west of the Olmec heartland.

=== Iconography in service to ideology ===
To explain the adoption of Olmec iconography and concepts throughout Mesoamerica, archaeologist F. Kent Reilly proposes a "Middle Form rulers. That is, the styles and the iconography, as well as the artifacts, were used by the rising elites in the Formative chiefdoms to authenticate or to increase their power and prestige.

This is echoed, among others, by archaeologist Giselle Canto Aguilera. Working at the Zazacatla site in Morelos, she found that the inhabitants of Zazacatla adopted Olmec styles when they changed from a simple, egalitarian society to a more complex, hierarchical one: "When their society became stratified, the new rulers needed emblems ... to justify their rule over people who used to be their equals."

== Summary ==
Olmec-influenced objects are found throughout Mesoamerica. The consensus among most, but by no means all, archaeologists and researchers is that Olmecs weren't purely a mother nor a sister to other Mesoamerican cultures, but the hallmarks of the Olmec iconography were developed within the Olmec heartland and that this iconography became, in the words of Michael Coe, an "all-pervading art style" throughout Mesoamerica (though Coe himself admits on the same page that there is "nothing [in the Xochipala figurines ] which would lead into the Olmec pattern"), promoting a "powerful, unitary religion" and an “official ideology”, an ideology that was adopted by distant indigenous chieftains and other elites eager to validate and bolster their claims to privilege.
