= Beatriz Barba =

Mexican anthropologist and archaeologist (1928–2021)

- Born: Beatriz Barba Ahuactzin; 16 September 1928; Mexico City, Mexico
- Died: 29 January 2021 (aged 92)
- Other names: Beatriz Barba Ahuactzin de Piña, Beatriz Barba de Piña Chán
- Occupation(s): academic, anthropologist, archaeologist
- Years active: 1950–2021

Beatriz Barba Ahuactzin (16 September 1928 – 29 January 2021) was a Mexican academic, anthropologist, and archaeologist, who was the second woman to earn a degree in archaeology in her country. She was a member of the National System of Researchers from 1985 and a member of the Mexican Academy of Sciences. Upon her fortieth anniversary of teaching, in 1991, she was honored with the gold Ignacio Altamirano Medal by the government of Mexico and the Secretariat of Education. In 2013, the National Institute of Anthropology and History (INAH) paid tribute to her life's work.

== Early life ==
Beatriz Barba Ahuactzin was born on 16 September 1928 in Mexico City. Both of her parents were teachers and, from a young age, Barba wanted to become a teacher. She earned a degree at the Escuela Nacional de Maestros (National Teacher's College), in 1949, with a thesis that addressed the spinal deformities of students caused by inadequate structure of the furniture they used. Wanting to further her knowledge of history and prepare as a secondary teacher, she enrolled at the Escuela Nacional de Antropología e Historia (ENAH) in 1950. While there, she met archaeologist Román Piña Chán, whom she later married and with whom she had three daughters.

== Career ==
Barba began her career teaching primary school in 1950, at the primary school, M-255 "Emiliano Zapata" while she worked on her thesis, entitled Tlapacoya: un sitio preclásico de transición (Tlapacoya: a pre-classic transitional site). Although she experienced some discrimination when doing field work, with workers not wanting to take orders from a woman, her husband was supportive as she persevered. In 1955, she received her master's degree, cum laude, in anthropology and became the "first Mexican woman to obtain the title of archaeologist". Her thesis examined the social development and religious practices of the Tlatilco culture at the Tlapacoya archaeological site.

Between 1957 and 1960, she taught history at Albert Einstein Secondary School Number Nine, while continuing her studies and earning her degree as an ethnologist from ENAH in 1960. She also worked as an adjunct professor at ENAH beginning in 1958, and conducted research in conjunction with her husband at sites in Tlatilco and in Valle de Guadalupe, Northern Jalisco.

In 1965, Barba founded the National Museum of Cultures in the building that previously, had served as a mint and then, as the Anthropological Museum. When a new building was created in 1964 for the National Museum of Anthropology, the former site was left vacant. Barba and professor Julio César Olivé pressed for the conversion of the building into a museum featuring world cultures. She served as the deputy director of the museum from 1965 to 1976, served as a guest lecturer in anthropology at the University of Guadalajara between 1972 and 1979, and from 1980, was a permanent lecturer for ENAH.

In 1982, Barba earned her master's degree in anthropological science from the National Autonomous University of Mexico (UNAM) and two years later, her Ph.D. degree. Her doctoral thesis, entitled Ambiente social y mentalidad mágica en México, las bases del pensamiento mágico en el México precortesiano (Social environment and mentality of magic in Mexico, the bases of magical thinking in pre-Cortesian Mexico), explored the indigenous cultural concept of magic before the Cortés conquest. Rather than the "demonic worship" depicted by Spaniards in their chronicles of Mexican culture, Barba's anthropological approach demonstrated that civilizations in ancient Mesoamerica had a reverence for the sacred, a devotion to creating books to pass on their extensive knowledge, and an appreciation of the vastness of universe.

In 1984, her husband fell during an excavation at the Becán archaeological site and became paralyzed. Barba and colleagues encouraged Piña to continue to his work writing fundamental texts on Mexican archaeology, which he did until his 2001 death.

Barba was appointed a national researcher level II by the Secretariat of Public Education (SEP) in 1985 and, in 1991, was the recipient of the Ignacio Altamirano Medal, presented by SEP and President Carlos Salinas de Gortari. From 1995, she led the permanent seminar on iconography for the National Institute of Anthropology and History (INAH). In 2002, she became the founding president of the Mexican Academy of Anthropological Sciences.

Upon her retirement in 2013, the National Institute of Anthropology and History paid homage to her career as a pioneering archaeologist and anthropologist. Thereafter, Barba taught privately from her home and compiled her husband's archives for the Universidad Autónoma de Campeche.

Barba died on 29 January 2021, at the age of 92.

== Publications ==
She published, among other documents:

- 2004: "Presentation of the Mexican Academy of Anthropological Sciences". In: Memories No. 1 2002–2004. pp. 21–26 Mexico.
- 2004: "Anthropology of tobacco". In: AMC Science Magazine, Vol. 55 No. 4. pp. 6–16. Mexico.
- 2004: "Some iconographic forms of death in pre-Hispanic times" In Mexican Iconography V. Scientific Collection of the INAH. No. 460. pp 87–129.
- 2005: “Meeting and dialogue of Mexican museum designers”. National Museum of Cultures. CONACULTA-INAH. pp. 13–23.
- 2005: "The museum work of Dr. Jorge Angulo Villaseñor". In: Mexican Iconography VI. DEAS-INAH.
- 2005: "Initial Words" In: Mexican Iconography VI. DEAS-INAH CD with NO.
- 2005: "Destructive elements in the Legend of the Suns". In, Mexican Iconography VI. DEAS-INAH.
- 2006: "The female deities in quiche creation". In, Women in Pre-Hispanic Mesoamerica. Mexico. Autonomous Mexico State University. Coordinated by Dra. Ma. De Jesús Rodríguez Shadow. pp. 59–70.
- 2006: "Social sciences and humanities in Mexico today". In Science Magazine of the AMC. Vol. 57, No. 1. pp. 78–85
- Jorge González Camarena, Ma. Teresa Favela, Transcripts of Master Conferences. No. 31, 2004. Permanent Seminary of Iconography. DEAS-INAH (Coordination of Publications of Beatriz Barba de Piña Chán.). Publication of 2 pamphlets of transcripts of keynote conferences of the permanent iconography seminar.

The mysteries of Xibalbá, Quiché underworld. Transcripts of Master Conferences No. 30, 2004, INAH.

- Attributes of two Greco-Roman goddesses, by Arch. Aída del Rocío Audiffred's Ladder. No. 33 of the series. Anthology of museology articles that were chosen as the minimum bibliography for the Diploma in Museology that was done in collaboration with the AMCA, AC and the Museum of El Carmen. The book consisted of 16 articles published in different books and specialized magazines.
- 2004: Introduction ”Mexican Iconography V: Life, Death and Transfiguration. INAH Scientific Collection. No. 460. pp 9-13, Mexico.
- “On the International Symposium: Strategies for Development of Indigenous People” in Diario de Campo, Internal Bulletin of Researchers in the Anthropology area No. 75, April 2005, Mexico, INAH, pp. 85–87.
