= Zohapilco =

Zohapilco is an archaeological site in the Central Highlands of Mexico at Tlapacoya Hill, on the edge of Lake Chalco, dating from 5500 – 2200BC. The similar site of Tlapacoya is nearby.

Zohapilco was a settlement most known for the earliest date of the use of ceramics, and was the major site for the Tlatilco culture. There are considerable connections to the Olmec culture.

Zohapilco was an open air site rather than a rock shelter, which is a precursor to the Late Archaic villages. Zohapilco did not have developed agriculture as the people relied more on hunting and gathering. Even though people inhabited the area throughout the wet and dry seasons, there is no conclusive evidence to prove permanent sedentism.

== Ceramics ==
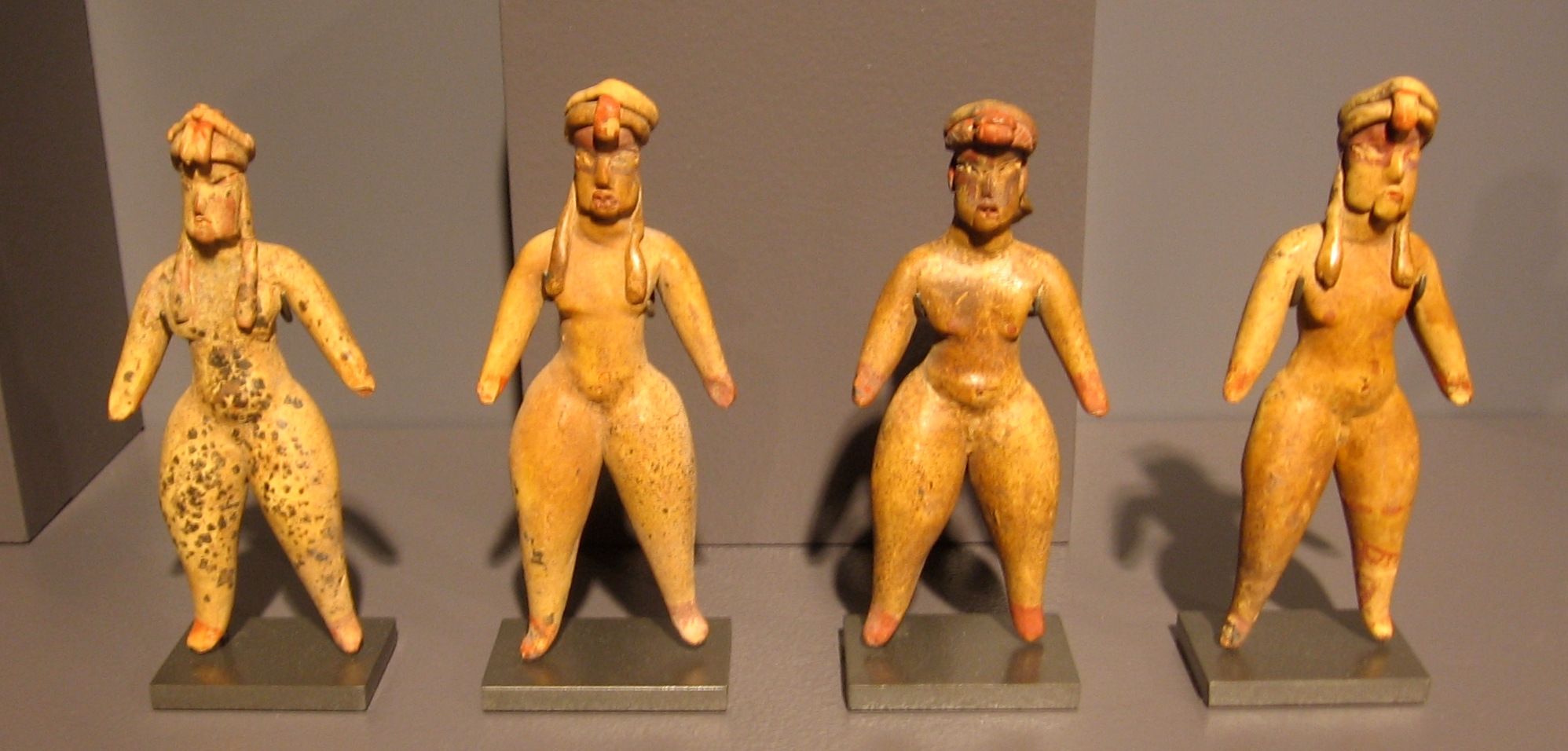
Four ceramic figurines

Zohapilco was the site where the oldest Middle American ceramic figure to date was found. Approximately 5000 years old and 5.7 cm long, it is an abstract figure of a pregnant woman broken at the torso. There are slight indentations for the eyes, a bulge for a nose, and an exaggerated swollen belly. Archaeologists believe that the figure pertains to fertility. Many ceramic figures have been found from that time that are broken that it is likely that they were made in times of crisis or event to show dedication, and then destroyed after the event was over Other ceramics that have been found are made of Tecomate which was used to make bowls and gourds. They are commonly a light brown colour with a red stripe on the rim of the bowl.

== Agriculture ==
On an excavation of the Zohapilco site, grains of teosinte, a wild ancestor of maize was found, indicating the possibility of an incipient agriculture system. Even though the domestication of maize had already begun in other areas of Central Mexico, the temperature and elevation of the site might have limited the practicality and feasibility of agriculture. It is also likely that the wild teosinte was better adapted to the climate than the domesticated maize and therefore was grown. Even though teosinte was found, agriculture was probably not the main food source of the people living in Zohapilco.

It was more likely that it was a non-agriculture subsistence base, supplied by the rich lacustrine resources. Early residents exploited the lakeshore for its resources of many wild animals and plants, as well as hunting deer, rabbit, waterfowl, and other inland species available in the surrounding ecological zones.

== History ==
In the earliest phase of Zohapilco, known as the Playa, residents used chipping, grinding, cutting and scraping tools. In the Middle Archaic age, around 3000BC, occupation of the area was interrupted because of a volcanic eruption, however the site was reoccupied in the Late Archaic, when it became home to Tlatilco Culture

== Geography ==
The terrain surrounding Zohapilco was a valley central lake system. It had grasslands with thorny woodland, scrub at upper elevations, swamplands around the lake, and was surrounded by mountains and hills.

== See also for images ==
- "A beautiful example from the early settlement of Tlapacoya . . . with undeniable Olmec inspiration"
