= Tlatilco acrobat =

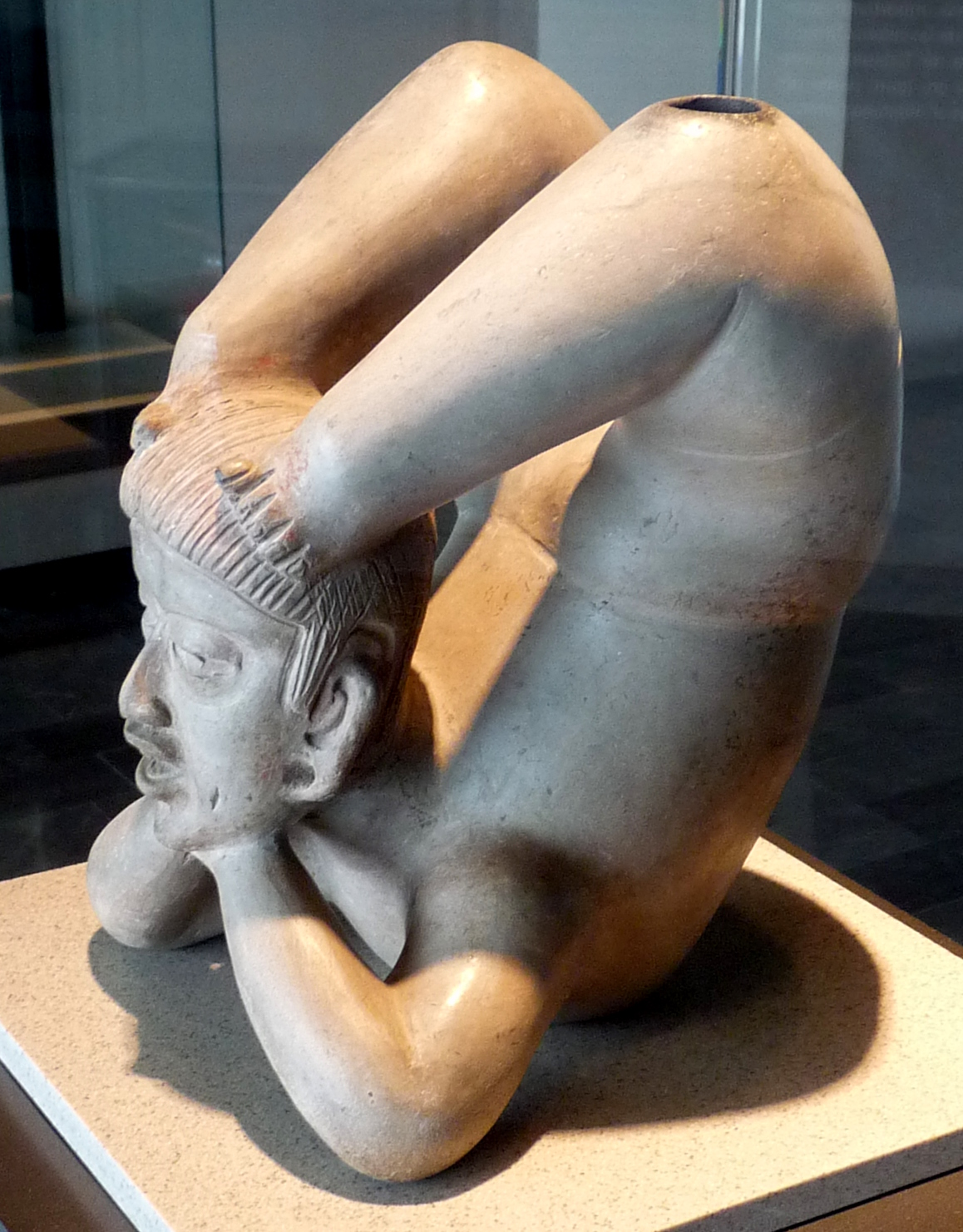
- Material: Ceramic.
- Size: 25 x 16 cm
- Period/culture: Preclassic (1200 BC – 600 AD)
- Discovered: Tlatilco, Mexico State
- Culture: Tlatilco culture
- Official catalogue of the National Museum of Anthropology

The Tlatilco Acrobat is a ceramic sculpture dating to the Mesoamerican Preclassic Period and the Tlatilco culture, which arose in the valley of Mexico in the mid-Preclassic (13th to 8th century B. C.)

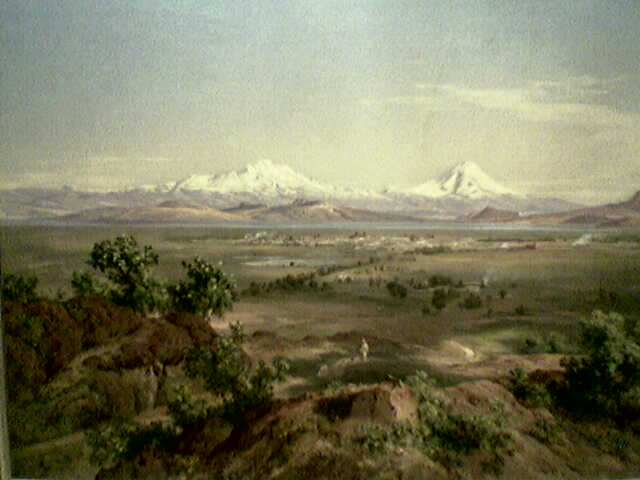
Painting of the valley of Mexico by José María Velasco.

== Discovery ==
The piece was found by brick workers in 1936. It was discovered in Tlatilco, a prehispanic settlement situated near the community of the same name in Mexico State. The Tlatilco culture was one of the first to settle in Anáhuac, on the banks of Lake Texcoco.

== Description ==
The sculpture depicts a man turning his body in an almost perfect circle so that his feet are placed on either side of his head. His hands also curl upward just below his feet. The face of this acrobat is expressive, with a long, hooked nose, almond-shaped eyes, slightly half-open mouth and droopy ears.

== Characteristics ==
- Style: Tlatilco culture with Olmec influences
- Technique: Pottery
- Material: Ceramic
- Height: 38.1 cm

== Conservation ==
The sculpture is exhibited in the National Museum of Anthropology in Mexico City.

== Gallery ==
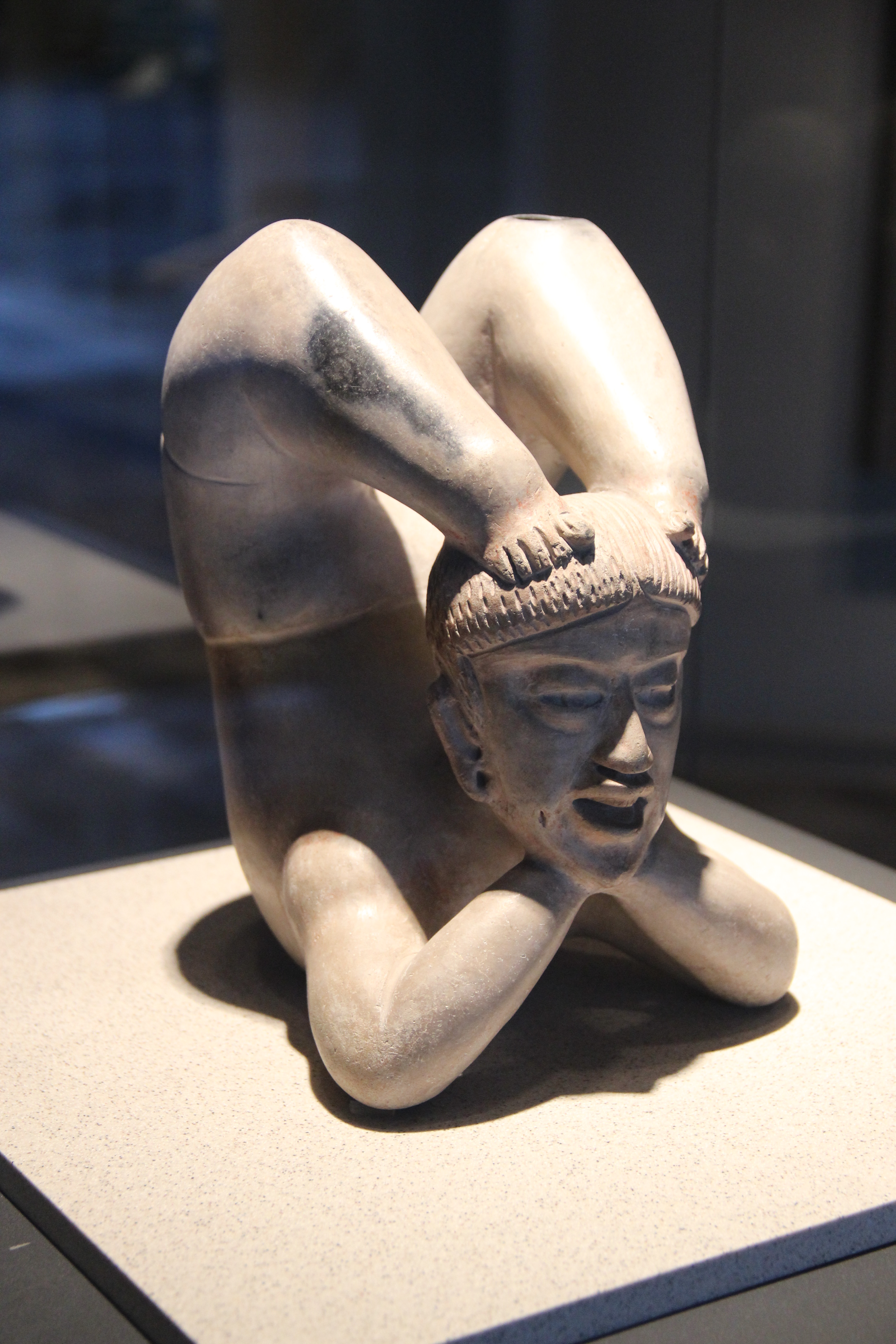

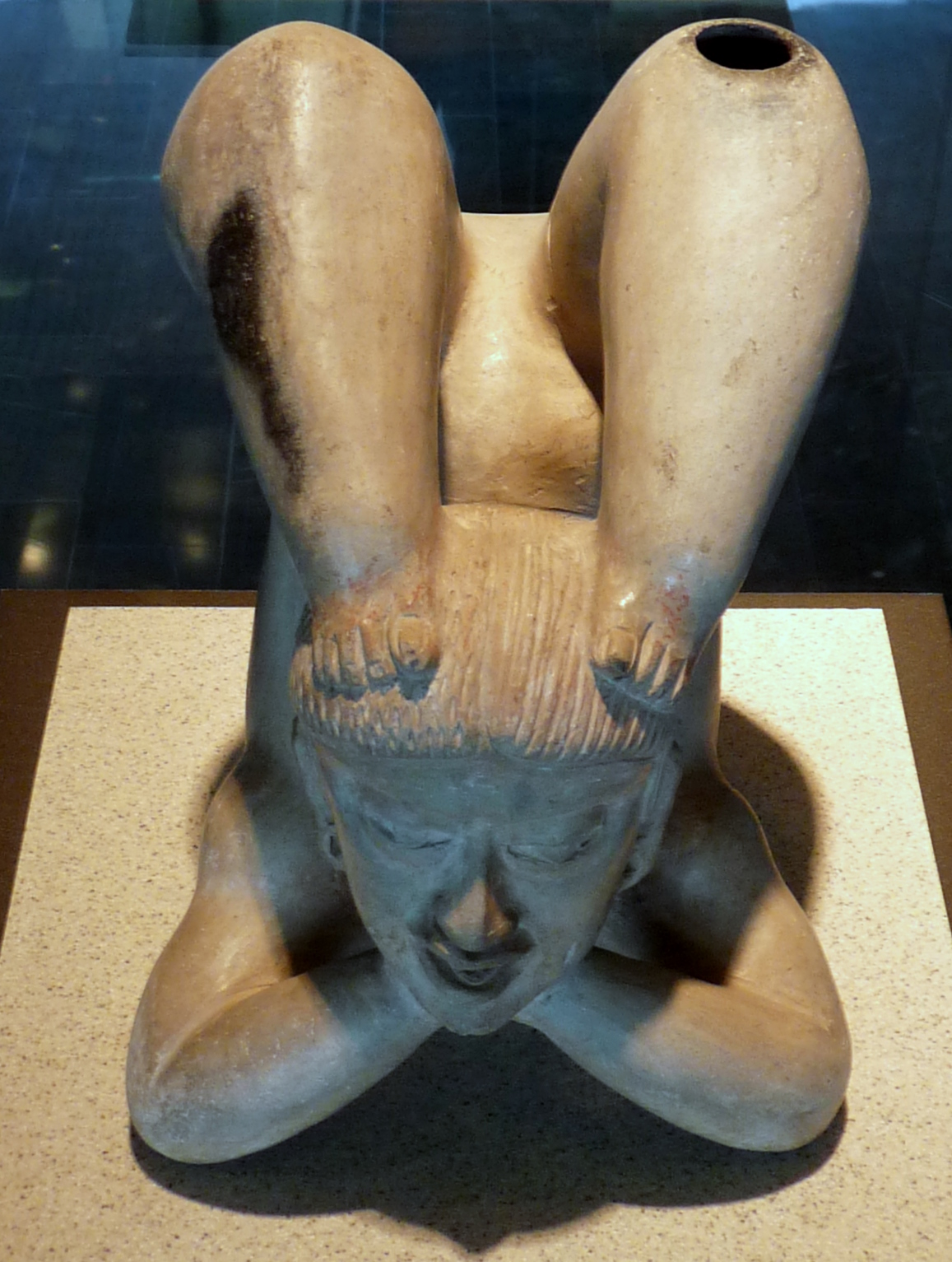

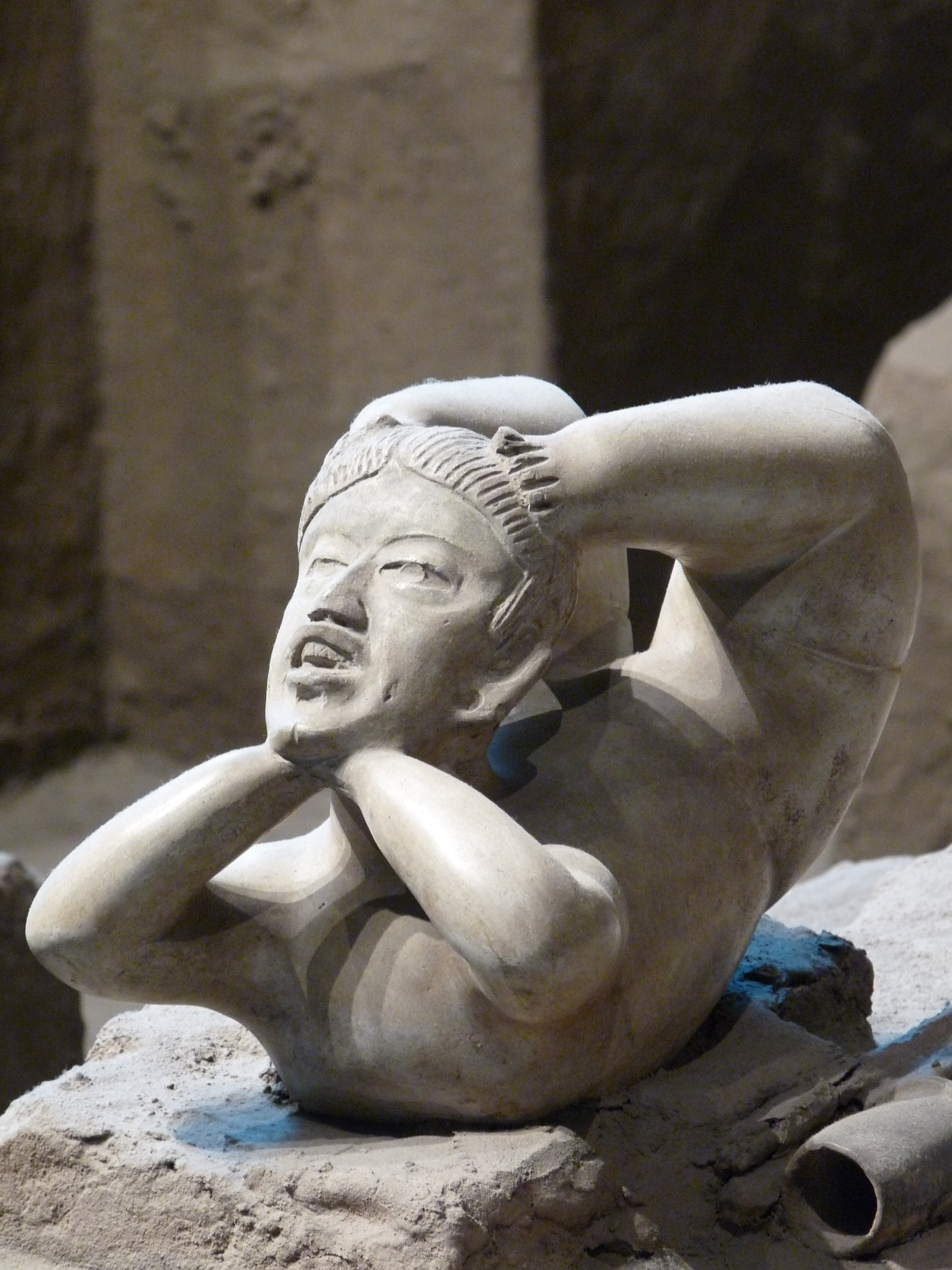

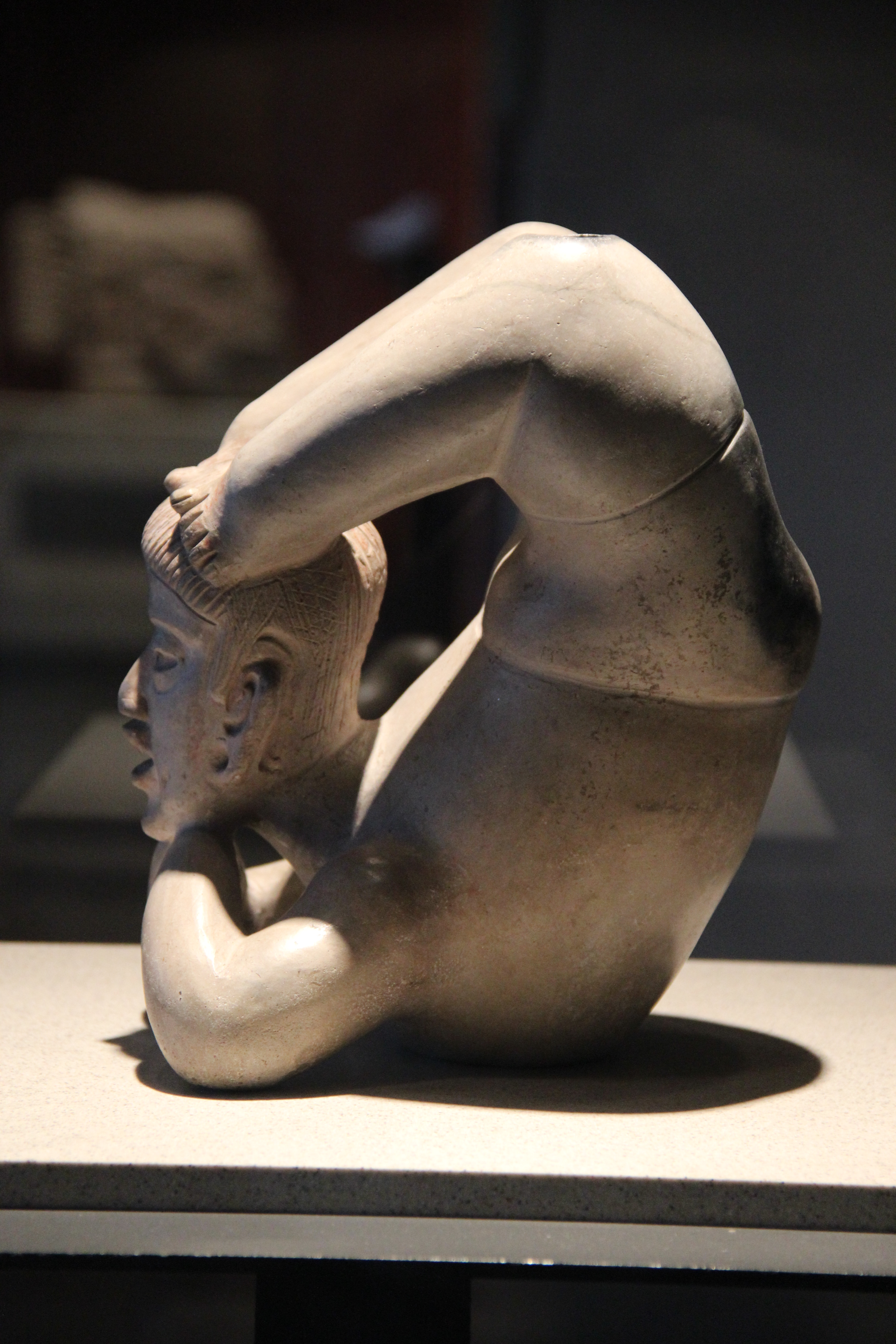

== See also ==
- Mesoamerican Preclassic period
- Tlatilco culture
- National Museum of Anthropology (Mexico)
