= Teopantecuanitlan =

Pre-Columbian site

Coordinates: 17°54′06″N 99°06′38″W

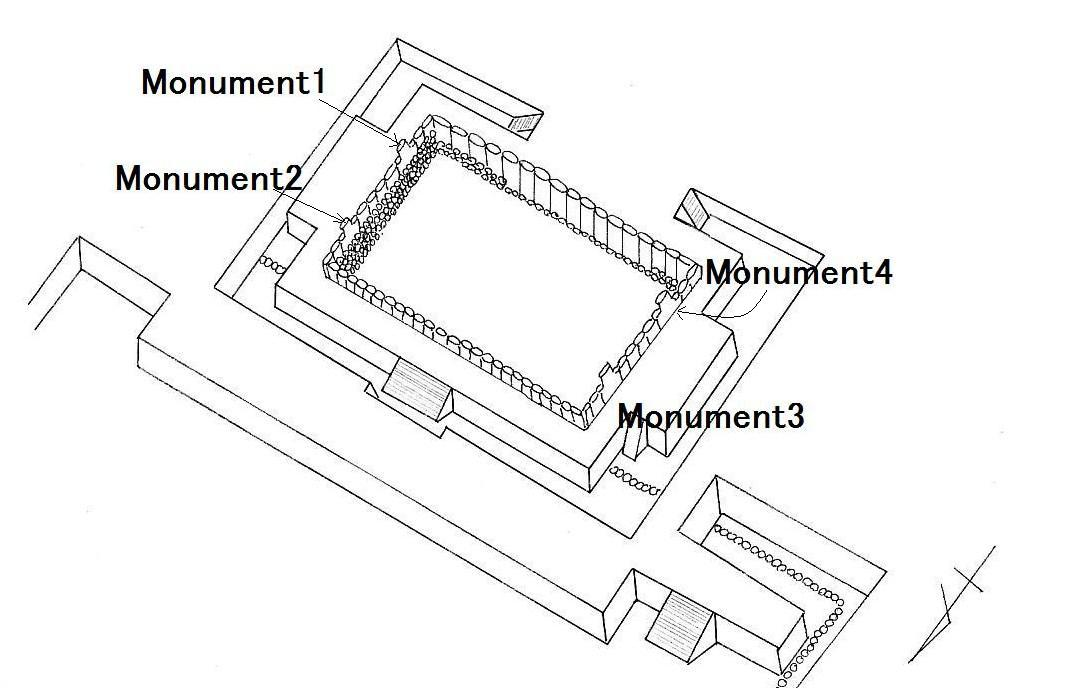
The sunken patio El Recinto

One of the four massive Olmec-style monoliths that greet visitors to El Recinto (the Sunken Patio).

Teopantecuanitlan is an archaeological site in the Mexican state of Guerrero that represents an unexpectedly early development of complex society for the region. The site dates to the Early to Middle Formative Periods, with the archaeological evidence indicating that some kind of connection existed between Teopantecuanitlan and the Olmec heartland of the Gulf Coast. Prior to the discovery of Teopantecuanitlan in the early 1980s, little was known about the region's sociocultural development and organization during the Formative period.

== Location ==
Teopantecuanitlan is located in the state of Guerrero, about 20 km in the southwesterly direction from the town of Copalillo. The nearest village is Tlalcozotitlan. It is situated at the convergence of the Amacuzac and Balsas rivers, and five miles (8 km) from where the Amacuzac flows into the Mezcala River, providing an environment for trade and travel. Teopantecuanitlan occupies some 1.6 to 2 km^{2} (500 acres), and is situated at the foot of a sharp hill which rises 200 m above the site.

Teopantecuanitlan was a center for a region that included Oxtotitlán, Juxtlahuaca, Xochipala, Zumpango del Río, and Chilpancingo.

== Art and architecture ==
Teopantecuanitlan was occupied from 1400 to 500 BCE, a period which is generally divided into four phases, peaking in population and complexity during Phase II, between 1000 and 800 BCE. The site's settlement largely consisted of residential compounds characterized by four structures arranged around a shared courtyard or plaza. The structures themselves were made of perishable materials built over stone basal foundations. Imported shell and obsidian artifacts, as well as Olmec-influenced ceramic wares, have been found in association with and inside the residential groups. These artifacts provide material evidence that the Teopantecuanitlan community was a part of an interregional trade network that linked the Gulf Coast with the highlands of Central Mexico.

Mezcala culture type artifacts were found in the Teopantecuanitlan area.

To the north of the Sunken Patio, clay sculptures were found. These were the oldest sculptures on the site. Some similarities are found between them and the monuments at Ojo de Agua, Chiapas, dated to 1200-1100 BC.

=== Sunken Patio ===
In addition to the residential areas, Teopantecuanitlan is notable for its monumental architecture, art, and agricultural terraces, in particular one of the first civil-ceremonial structures in all of Mesoamerica, El Recinto ("the enclosure"), also known as the Sunken Patio, constructed during Phase II (between 1000 and 800 BCE). The Sunken Patio is so-named because it is 2 meters (7 ft) below the natural ground level, built on a base of yellow clay, dressed with travertine blocks.

Four large, nearly identical, monumental travertine blocks adorn the east and west sides of the Sunken Patio. These blocks are carved to resemble anthropomorphic creatures, most likely were-jaguars, with almond-shaped eyes and down-turned mouths. In fact, it is these 3- to 5-ton monuments that are referred to in archaeologist Guadalupe Martinez Donjuán's name for the site, Teopantecuanitlan, Nahuatl for "place of the temple of the jaguar". According to Martinez Donjuán, these sculptures are situated so as to mark the equinoxes or solstices, and they "symbolized the opposing forces that ruled the world".

The back of one of these monuments, Monument 2, contains symbols which Martinez Donjuán interprets as "10 Flower". If this interpretation is correct, this would be the oldest Mesoamerican calendar date yet discovered.

This site also contains two ballcourts. One miniature ball court is located within the Sunken Patio itself while the other lies 900 m to the northeast. At one end of the smaller ball court there is an adobe sweat bath. This sweat bath was most likely used as a social bonding environment for the developing elite class of Teopantecuanitlan.

Stone-faced patios and bas-relief monumental art are the features that are also found at the site of Chalcatzingo, Morelos. These are the only two sites known with these features. The sunken patio of Teopantecuanitlan is older. There are also other parallels between these sites.

=== Other features ===
Teopantecuanitlan is also home to the oldest known Mesoamerican dam. This dam was constructed around 1200 BCE and built of rough uncut rocks. This dam relied on gravity to bring water to the agricultural land. Canals, or channels, made of large flat stone slabs are also present in Teopantecuanitlan. The lining of these canals were of benefit to the domestication of plants by being a means of irrigation. These canals prevented erosion damage, loss of water also acted as a sewer.

This site is also the first known within Mesoamerica to utilize the architectural feature known as a corbelled vault. This vault allowed for high ceilings without the use of trapezoidal cut stone. These corbelled vaults were used in ancient structures such as the tombs of the elite and in temples.

Teopantecuanitlan society was not egalitarian — otherwise such monumental structures would not have been built. There was a leader in place to oversee the building of these structures as well as instruct the laborers and ensure that all the necessary resources were available.

== Discovery and excavation ==
Teopantecuanitlan was discovered by Martinez Donjuán in 1983, after reports of looting at this Guerrero site. She was assisted in this effort by, among others, Christine Niederberger. Niederberger focused in particular on the residential areas known as the Lomerios zone, or as Tlacozotitlán.

The Teopantecuanitlan site is open to the public Tuesdays through Sundays from 10:00 to 17:00 hours.

== Olmec connections ==
Teopantecuanitlan in relation to other Formative Period archaeological sites.

Olmec influence is seen in many of the monuments of Teopantecuanitlan. In addition to the four prominent monuments discussed above, Olmec style or Olmec-influenced artifacts have been found throughout the site.

There are several theories regarding how such Olmec motifs and designs — perhaps even deities — came to be at a site hundreds of miles/kilometers from the Olmec heartland. Martinez Donjuán believes that the roots of the Olmec culture lie in Teopantecuanitlan, and a splinter group left Teopantecuanitlan to colonize what we call the Olmec "heartland". a revival of Miguel Covarrubias's hypothesis, first formulated in 1946.

The state of Guerrero seems to have played important role in the early history of Olmec culture. Olmec-style artifacts tend to appear earlier in some parts of Guerrero than in the Veracruz-Tabasco area. In particular, the objects from the Amuco-Abelino site in Guerrero reveal dates as early as 1530 BC.

Noted archaeologist Michael D. Coe has said that this "position is contradicted by the environmental constraints" imposed by the semi-arid Guerrero highlands. Niederberger finds Olmec influence only in the monumental architecture, with the rest of the culture derived from indigenous sources.
