= Tlatilco culture =

1250–800 BCE culture in the Valley of Mexico

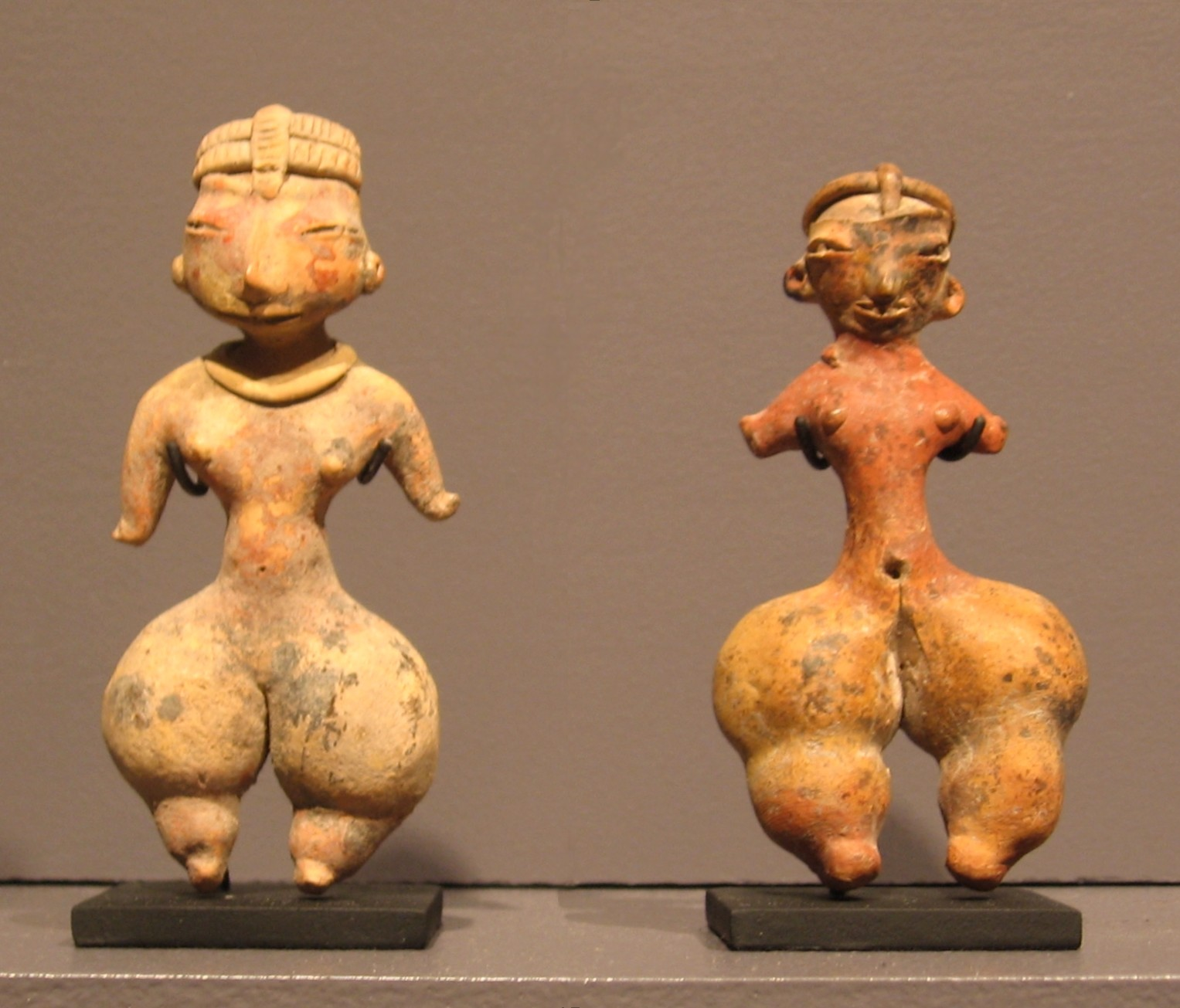
Two Tlatilco figurines, from the Manantial phase, 1000 - 800 BCE.

Tlatilco culture is a culture that flourished in the Valley of Mexico between the years 1250 BCE and 800 BCE, during the Mesoamerican Early Formative period. Tlatilco, Tlapacoya, and Coapexco are the major Tlatilco culture sites.

Tlatilco culture shows a marked increase in specialization over earlier cultures, including more complex settlement patterns, specialized occupations, and stratified social structures. In particular, the development of the chiefdom centers at Tlatilco and Tlapacoya is a defining characteristic of Tlatilco culture.

This period also saw a significant increase in long distance trade, particularly in iron ore, obsidian, and greenstone, trade which likely facilitated the Olmec influence seen within the culture, and may explain the discovery of Tlatilco-style pottery near Cuautla, Morelos, 90 miles (140 km) to the south.

== Defining the Tlatilco culture ==
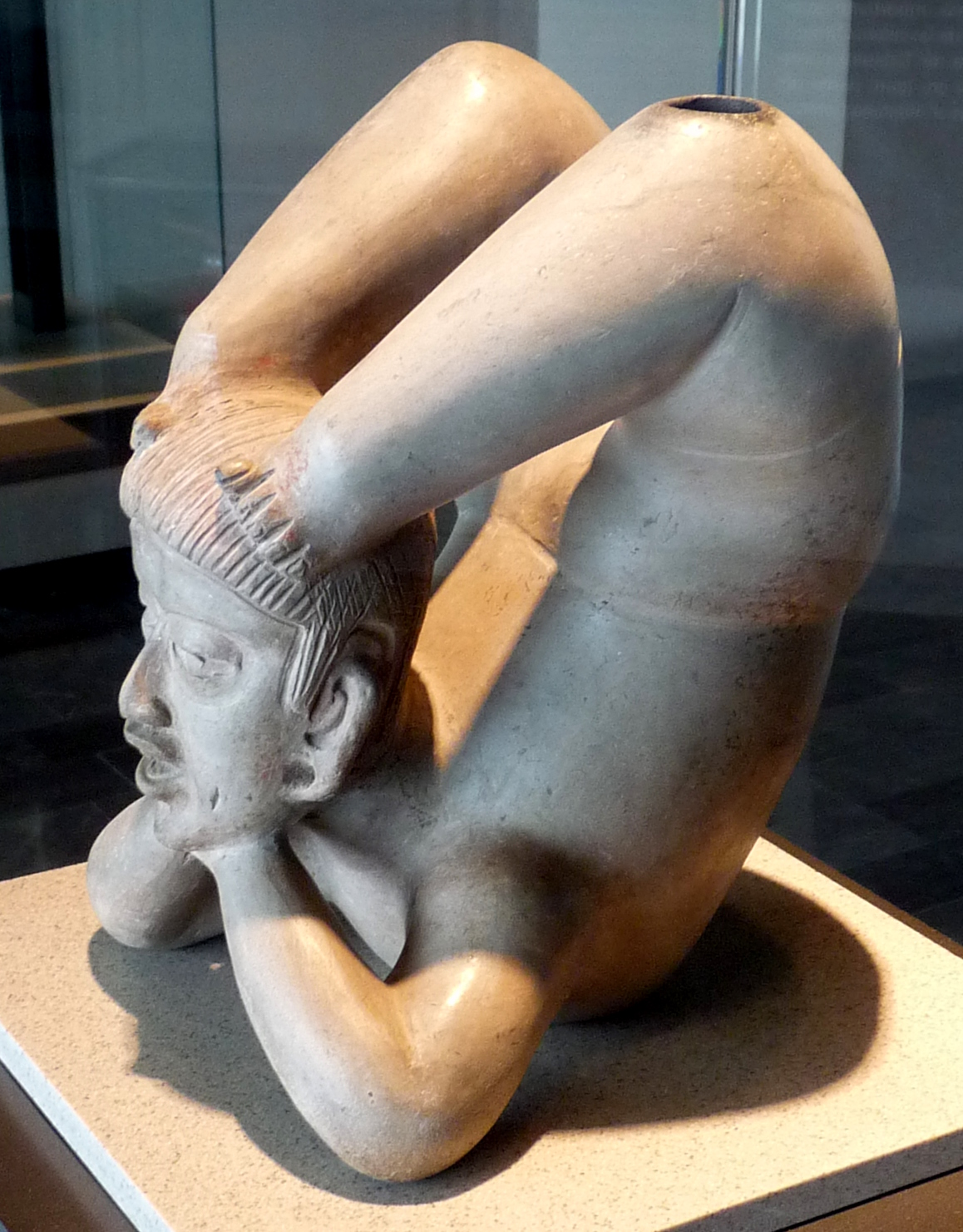
The "Acrobat", ceramic art from Tlatilco, dated 1200-900 BCE. This figurine's left knee has a hole for pouring liquid.

Archaeologically, the advent of the Tlatilco culture is denoted by a widespread dissemination of artistic conventions, pottery, and ceramics known as the Early Horizon (also known as the Olmec or San Lorenzo Horizon), Mesoamerica's earliest archaeological horizon.

Specifically, the Tlatilco culture is defined by the presence of:

- Both ritual and utilitarian ceramics.
- Both animal and human figurines rendered in a somewhat stylized manner.
- Clay masks and other exotic ritual objects.
- Elaborate burials with grave offerings.
- Olmec-style decorations, motifs, designs, and figurines such as the hollow "baby-face" figurines or the pilli-style costumed males.

The Olmec influence is unmistakable. One survey of Tlatilco graves found that Olmec-style objects were "ubiquitous" in the earliest upper-middle status burials but were unrelated to wealth. That is, no correlation was found between the markers of high status and Olmec-style objects, and although larger numbers of Olmec-style objects were found in rich graves, they constituted a smaller percentage of the grave goods there.

== Phases ==
Christine Niederberger Betton, in her landmark 1987 archaeological study of the Valley of Mexico, identified two phases of the Tlatilco culture:

- Ayotla (Coapexco) phase, 1250 - 1000 BCE
- Manantial phase, 1000 - 800 BCE.

External videos
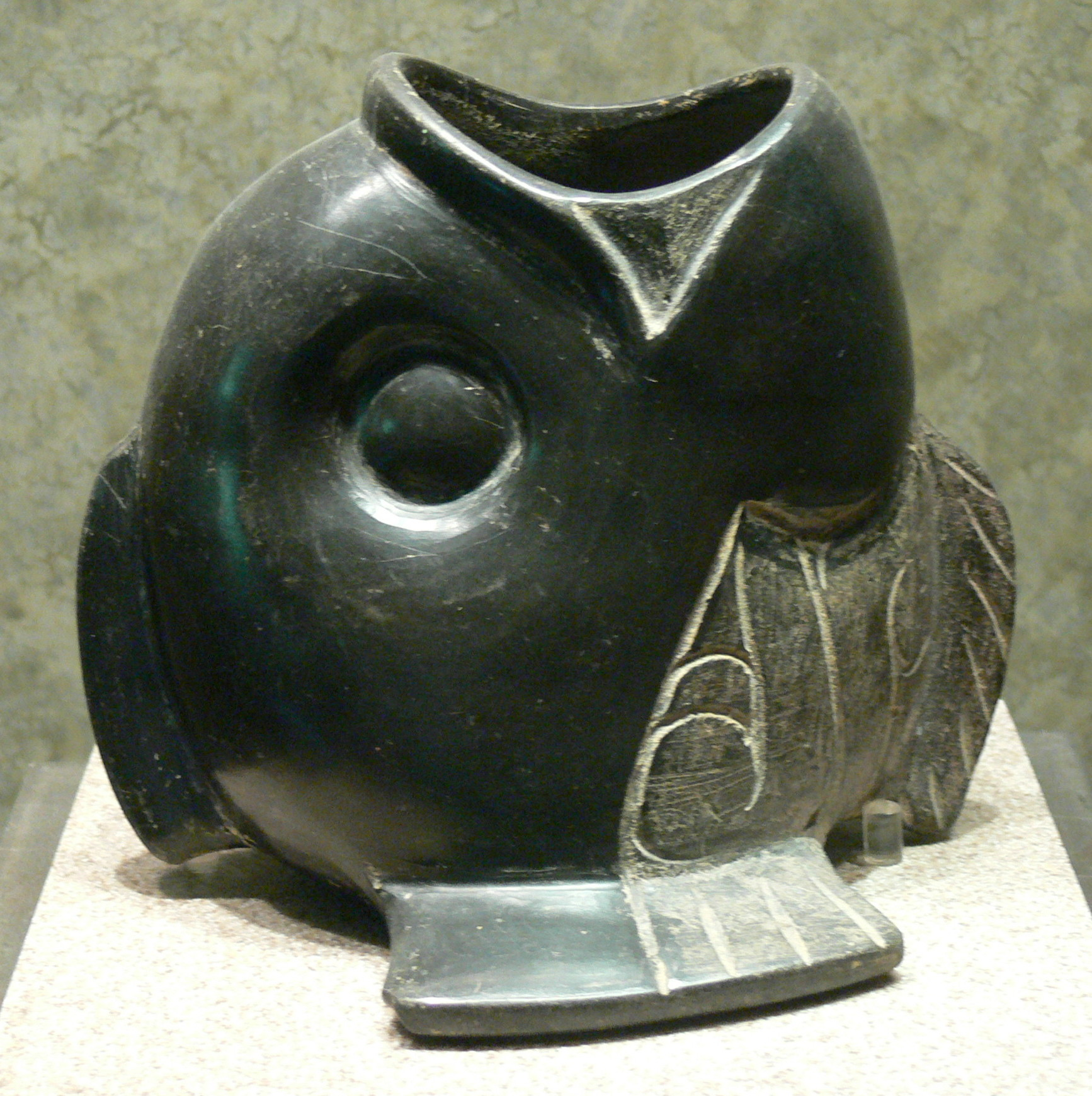
- Tlatilco figurines, Smarthistory

The Olmec-style artifacts appear suddenly, abundantly, and pervasively in the archaeological record at the outset of the Ayotla (Coapexco) phase.

At the end of the Ayotla, however, around 1000 BCE, there is another abrupt change in ceramics: figurines of costumed males give way to those of nude females, and Olmec-derived iconography evolves into a more native appearance, changes likely reflective of a change in religious ideas and practices.

By 800 BCE, the hallmarks of the Tlatilco culture fade from the archaeological record. By 700 BCE, Cuicuilco had become the largest and most dynamic city in the Valley of Mexico, eclipsing Tlatilco and Tlapacoya.

== See also ==
- Olmec figurine

== Notes ==
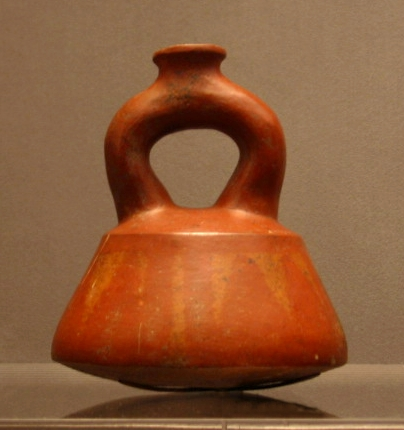
Usually associated with the Moche, this stirrup jar is from Tlatilco, 1100 - 800 BCE.
