= Christine Niederberger Betton =

French archaeologist

Christine Niederberger Betton, born in Bordeaux and died in 2001 in Mexico City, was a French archaeologist. She is mainly noted for her contributions to the field of pre-Columbian American archaeology, in particular for her work on Mesoamerican cultures in central Mexico.

== Early life ==
Christine Niederberger was born in Bordeaux, France, the daughter of Roger Betton and Linka Lowczynski. She began her higher education at the l'École supérieures nationales des langues orientales. From 1965 to 1968, she continued a training in archaeology at the National School of History and Anthropology (ENAH) in Mexico. Its beginnings works of archaeologists will take place with Tlapacoya, precisely on the site of Zohapilco. The results of this excavation lead it to present her thesis in 1974 entitled: Zohapilco. Cinco milenios of ocupación humana en un sitio lacustre de la Cuenca de México. A few years later, in 1981, Christine Niederberger obtains a doctorate of State at the School for Advanced Studies in the Social Sciences, in Paris. The subject of her doctorate, under the direction of Jean Guilaine, is entitled Paléopaysages and pre-urban archaeology of the basin of Mexico. This thesis became a reference and will be published by the Center of Mexican Studies and Centraméricaines (CEMCA) in 1987.

She was married to Jean-Marie Niederberger.

== Archaeology ==
Its search and its excavations, as archaeologist, were particularly innovative and founder of a new school of thought. On the one hand, she called into question a chronology proposed for the site of Zohapilco, on the level of the occupations in connection with Olmec style. In addition, she strongly contributed to change the generally accepted ideas, about Olmec culture which is not limited to the Zona Metropolitana Olmeca (ZMO), in English, refer to as the Olmec heartland. At the contrary the Olmec culture was a multi-ethnic unit and pluri-linguistic culture covering a vast part of the Mesoamerica, in the period from 1200 BC to about 500 BC. The model of Christine Niederberger thus shows the unit of Middle America from 1200 BC through the Olmec style identified by a particular appearance: pan-Mesoamerica.

She was a great professionalist and an extremely meticulous person on the excavations. Christine Niederberger has always chose with many precautions the places to excavate. Of a great patience, she analyzed, gathered and recorded all the evidence. But the results of these studies which force admiration as well on the form as on the bottom. Its archaeological analyses were always supported by the results of various specialists, thus supporting her reputation of intellectual honesty.

== Published works ==
She was the author of many articles and several works in particular "Zohapilco. Cinco milenios de ocupación humana en un sitio lacustre de la Cuenca de México" (1976) and "Paléo-paysages et archéologie pré-urbaine du Bassin de Mexico" (1987). She wrote an important article in Science : Early Sedentary Economy in the Basin of Mexico City (1979) like several standard commodities in the French Encyclopædia Universalis like La civilisation olmèque ou la naissance de la Mésoamérique (1985).

contributed chapters and conference papers—

- Niederberger Betton, Christine (1986). "Excavacion de una area de habitacion domestica en la capital "Olmeca" de Tlacozotitlan. Reporte Preliminar". In Roberto Cervantes-Delgado (ed.). Primer Coloquio de Arquelogía y Etnohistoria del Estado de Guerrero (in Spanish) (Conference proceedings: Coloquio de Arqueología y Etnohistoria del Estado de Guerrero (1st, 1984: Chilpancingo de los Bravos, Mexico) ed.). México, D.F.: Instituto Nacional de Antropología e Historia; Gobierno del Estado de Guerrero. pp. 83–103. OCLC 17475087.

== See also ==
- Olmec
- Mesoamerica
- Mesoamerican chronology
- Olmec figurine
- Cascajal block
