= Tlatilco =

Pre-Columbian village in Mexico

Coordinates: 19°30′N 99°15′W

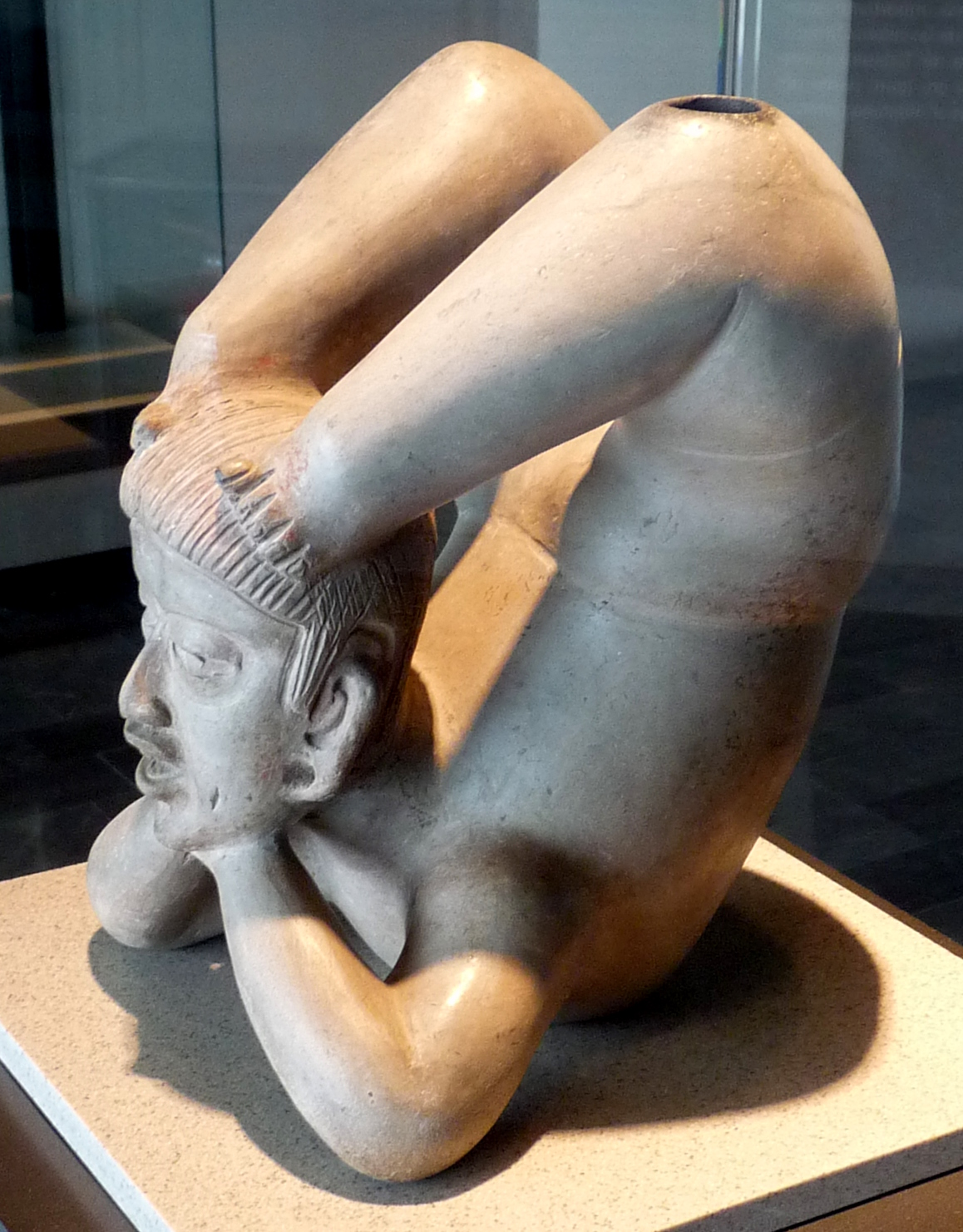
Ceramic art recovered from Tlatilco, commonly known as the "Acrobat". c. 1300 - 800 BCE.

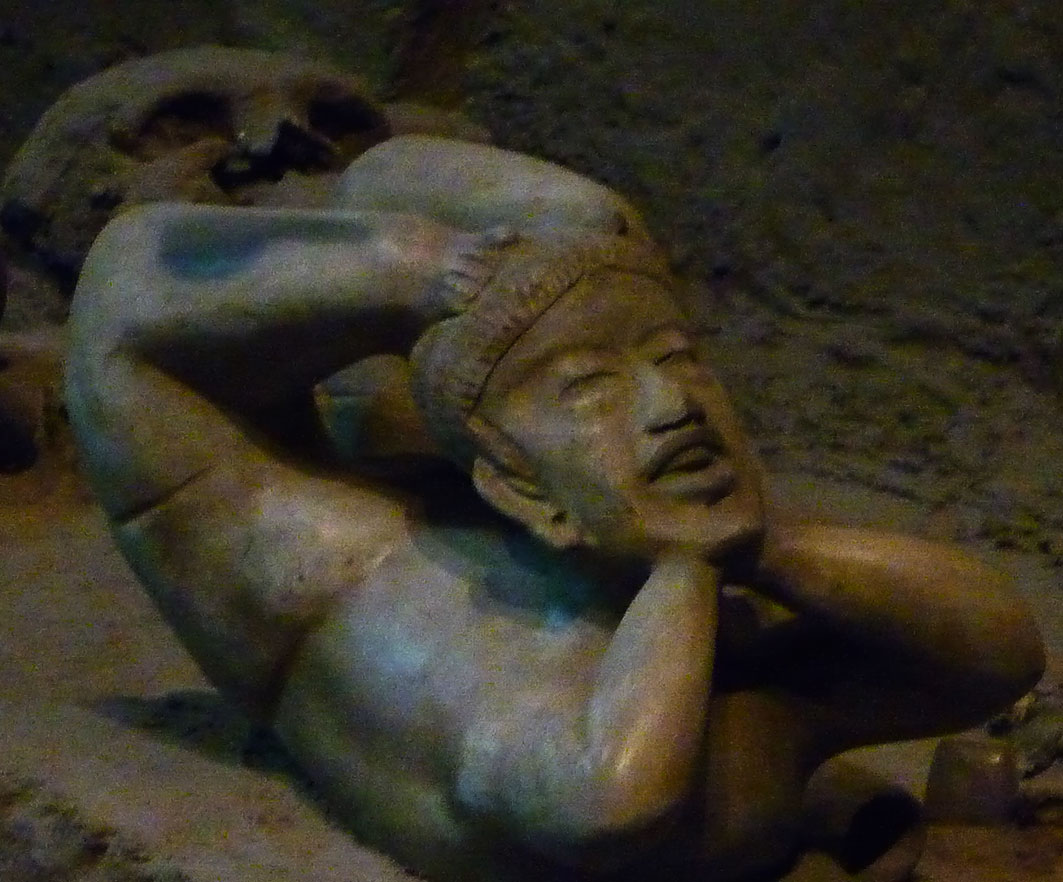
Another acrobat figurine from Tlatilco

Tlatilco was a large pre-Columbian village in the Valley of Mexico situated near the modern-day town of the same name in the Mexican Federal District. It was one of the first chiefdom centers to arise in the Valley, flourishing on the western shore of Lake Texcoco during the Middle Pre-Classic period, between the years of 1200 BCE and 200 BCE. It gives its name to the "Tlatilco culture", which also includes the town of Tlapacoya, on the eastern shore of Lake Chalco, as well as the Coapexco site which lies east of the Amecameca municipality within Mexico State.

Tlatilco is noted in particular for its high quality pottery pieces, including many human figurines as well as certain pieces featuring Olmec iconography. These Olmec-style artifacts have led to speculation concerning the nature of Olmec influence on other Mesoamerican cultures, and the presence of them is what led famous Mexican artist and ethnographer Miguel Covarrubias to eventually formally excavate the site.

The name "Tlatilco" was possibly given by the Aztecs before the arrival of the Spanish. It comes from the Nahuatl language, and means "where things are hidden".

Tlatilco reached its heyday during the period from 1000 to 700 BCE, during the Olmec horizon. The following Zacatenco phase (700-400 BCE) saw a cessation of the use of Olmec iconography and forms.

== Olmec influence ==
The Olmec are the earliest known major Mesoamerican civilization, and their art carried an extremely distinct style. When Covarrubias discovered the Olmec-style artifacts being sold at Tlatilco he was unsure as to whether they had been excavated on site, or had been imported from other sites in modern times to be sold there. The desire to answer this question was an important influence on what led him to eventually begin excavations. Initial thoughts were that the artifacts had been brought from the Gulf Coast several hundred miles away, as that area is the Olmec heartland. Excavation however, revealed that Olmec artifacts were in fact present at the site of Tlatilco in pre-Columbian times. The unmistakable Olmec art style was found on a minority of burials at the site, including the iconic Olmec-style baby-face figurines. The Olmec site of San Lorenzo was an Early Formative site that was contemporary with Tlatilco, and the Olmec-style objects found at Tlatilco are in the San Lorenzo-style. Other than these few objects, the rest of the Tlatilco artifacts seem to be in a native ceramic tradition.

Miguel Covarrubias believed that the presence of Olmec artifacts at Tlatilco was due to an influx of Olmec aristocrats from the eastern lowlands. This is one possibility, however it is equally likely that there was no movement of people but rather a movement of goods and artifacts, with Tlatilco having received heavy influence from Olmec "missionaries" who would come to spread tradition and ideology. In either case, it is clear there was some sort of contact between the Olmecs and Tlatilco.

== Excavations and findings ==
The Tlatilco site was used in modern times as a source of clay for brick-making. By the 1930s, many of the ancient artifacts thereby uncovered made their way into the hands of collectors, including Miguel Covarrubias, artist and ethnographer. Covarrubias led the first controlled excavation in 1942, in collaboration with the Instituto Nacional de Antropologia e Historia. By 1949, over 200 burials were identified at Tlatilco, leading to its categorization as a necropolis. Two major archaeological excavations followed, with over 500 burials eventually identified, many with intact grave offerings. The last field season also undertook a systematic survey of non-burial structures, leading to the realization that these hundreds of burials were apparently located under ancient houses—although no traces of them remain - as well as among the various trash pits, and that Tlatilco was not a necropolis, but rather a major chiefdom center.

Many burials, primarily of high status individuals, show evidence of dental mutilation and artificial cranial deformation, most probably through the use of cradleboards. Additionally, lavish offerings such as pottery and figurines were found with many of the skeletons. The presence of these items is further evidence that these buried individuals were of high status, as objects such as figurines were very rarely found as burial furniture in Formative-period Mexico.

The Tlatilcans' agriculture was focused on maize, but also included beans, amaranth, and squash, and chili peppers. These plants were supplemented with various fowl, including migratory birds, wild rabbits and other smaller mammals, and deer and antelope.

== Excavation difficulties ==
Tlatilco was originally discovered accidentally in the 1930s by brick-workers who were digging in the area, not archeologists. The brick-workers were attracted to the site due to the fact that the clayish soil in the area proved to be a good source in the brick-making process. In 1936 Miguel Covarrubias discovered Olmec-style objects for sale at the site, and a market for these antiquities developed rapidly thanks not only to Covarrubias’s interest, but also the interest of notable Mexican painter Diego Rivera.

The interest from these two men caused prices to skyrocket which caused many non-Tlatilco objects to be sold under the label of Tlatilco which further complicates our understanding of the variability of ceramics from the site. Additionally, the brick-makers quickly came to the realization that selling antiquities was more profitable than making bricks, and it would be another six years before Covarrubias and his collaborators would actually start excavations. Due to these factors and others, only a very small portion of Tlatilco was ever cleared under scientific conditions. It has been speculated that hundreds, or even up to a thousand, burials have been destroyed by brick-workers.

During the ongoing excavations, the brick-work was not halted and instead continued on in other areas of Tlatilco. It is believed that the exploitation and art dealing carried on throughout the 1960s. Many of the objects purchased at Tlatilco by dealers and collectors between the 1930s and 1960s eventually made it into both private and public museum collections, in the United States especially.

In current times, the site of Tlatilco can be characterized by its transformation into a large industrial zone. Situated within the sprawling urban landscape of modern Mexico City, Tlatilco is now topped by factories, warehouses, and dense low-income urbanism. The combination of all of these things has made the site very difficult for archeologists to parse through, and at this point it is very unlikely that there will ever be further excavations.

== Tlatilco figurines ==
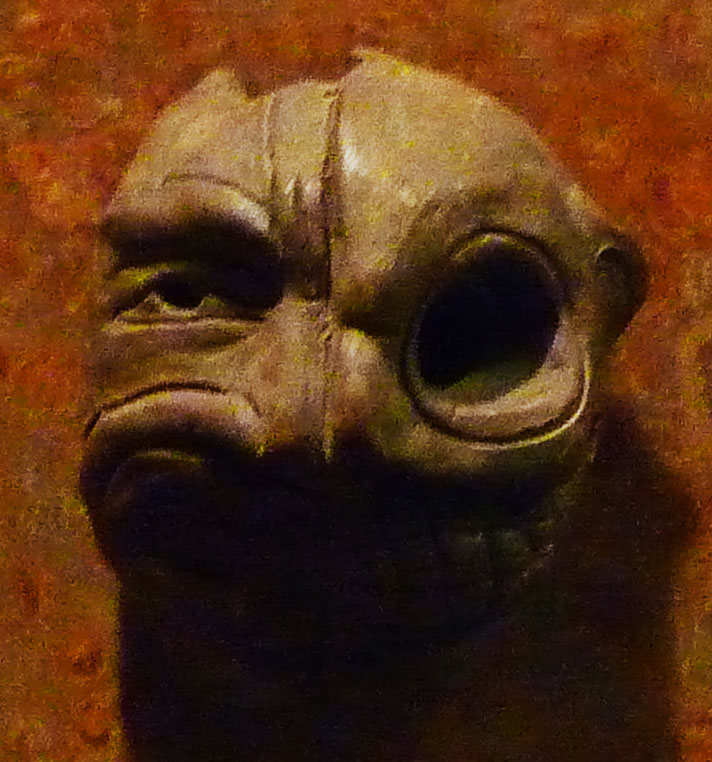
Small ceramic mask from Tlatilco commonly referred to as the duality mask

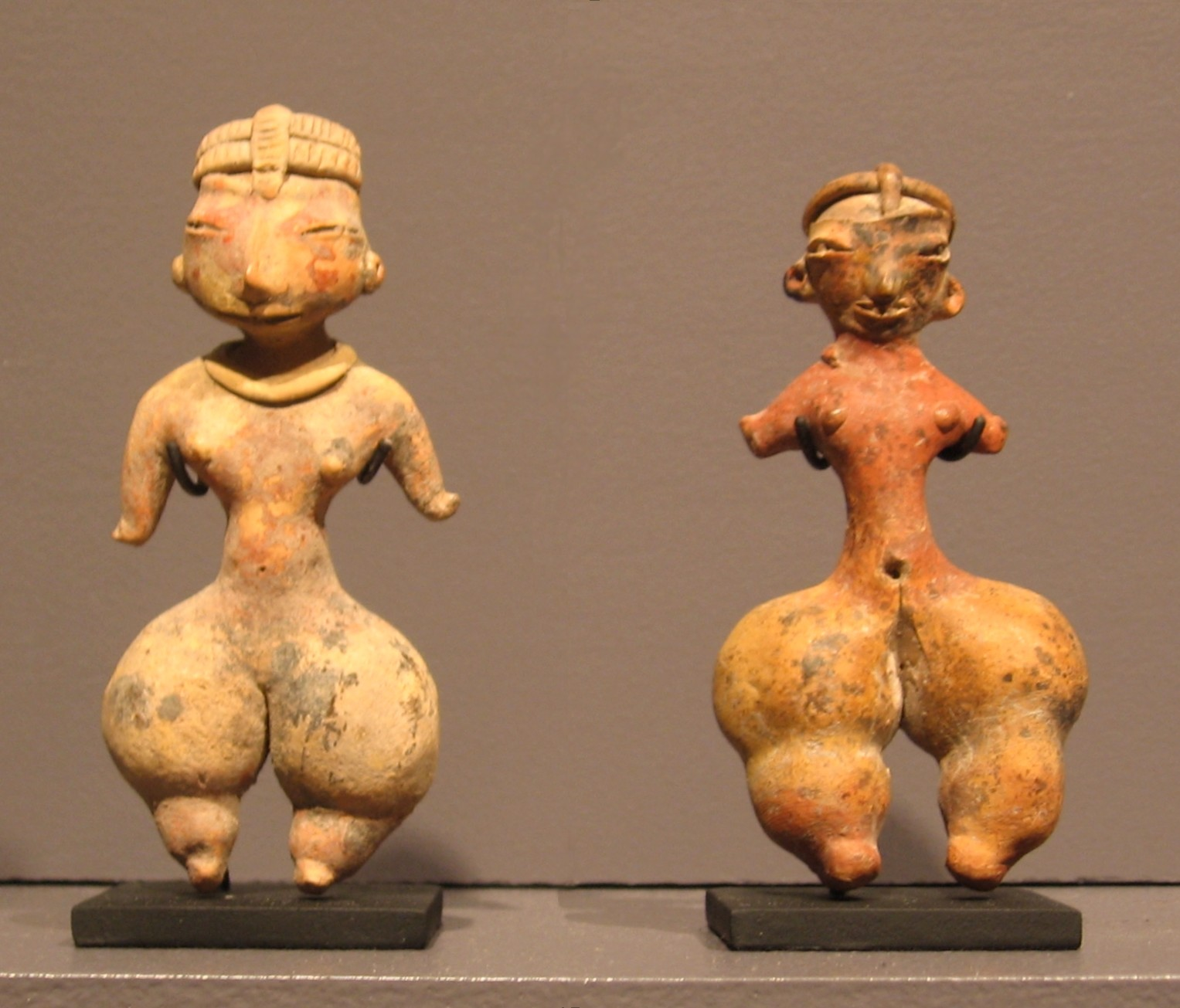
Two Tlatilco figurines, from the Manantial phase, 1000 - 800 BCE.

Tlatilco ceramic figurines come in many different shapes and sizes, and they depict a wide variety of individuals, giving us a very useful insight to the lives of the people that inhabited this place so many years ago. On top of normal depictions of humans, Tlatilco figurines frequently stand out for their depictions of deformities or other anomalies.

Artifacts include:

- Hollow female figurine with traces of red, yellow, and white paint
- Frequent depictions of females with exaggerated hips and breasts along with small waists
- Figurines occasionally attired in what is assumed to be grass skirts
- Male figurines dressed in breechclout-loincloths
- Female figurines affectionately carrying children or dogs
- Dancers, some with rattles around their legs
- Players of the ritual Mesoamerican ballgame wearing the hand and knee protection that was required for the sport
- Couples depicted on couches
- Many Two-headed figurines
- Depictions of hunchbacks
- A figurine with three eyes, two noses, and two mouths all on the same head
- Scary and sometimes masked individuals who may have been shaman
- Many clay masks, including a few duality masks which are split vertically into two distinct faces.
- Pottery such as bottles, bowls and dishes. As well as ceramic art that included representations of armadillos, wild turkeys, bears, frogs, rabbits, fish, ducks, and turtles.

The noticeably high number of two-headed figures has led some researchers to wonder whether Tlatilco was perhaps a cluster site for conjoined twins. Additionally, the frequent emphasis of females with swelling breasts and thighs in combination with a narrow waist has led some researchers to speculate as to the existence of an ancient cult dedicated to fertility as part of local tradition.

A lot of other very interesting things can be gleaned from these artifacts. The dancer figurines indicate a likelihood of ceremonies that involve dancing, and the ones with rattles around their legs show the importance of certain regalia in these ceremonies. The women depicted holding dogs show that the people of Tlatilco had domesticated pets or at least knowledge of the existence of them. Lastly, the ballgame player figurines indicate that the staple ritual sport across much of Mesoamerica was also important to the inhabitants of Tlatilco.
