= Tlapacoya (archeological site) =

Coordinates: 19°18′06″N 98°54′46″W

Valley of Mexico, 1847. Bruff/Disturnell map. Tlapacoya is in the lower right corner

Tlapacoya is an important archaeological site in Mexico, located at the foot of the Tlapacoya volcano, southeast of Mexico City, on the former shore of Lake Chalco. Tlapacoya was a major site for the Tlatilco culture.

Tlapacoya is known in particular for Tlapacoya figurines. These sophisticated earthware figurines were generally created between 1500 and 300 BCE and are representative of the Preclassic Period.

Tlapacoya was also a manufacturing center for so-called "Dragon Pots" (see photo below). These flat-bottomed cylindrical bowls have white or buff surfaces incised with almost abstract Olmec-style drawings, generally of were-jaguars.

== Evidence of Earlier Habitation ==
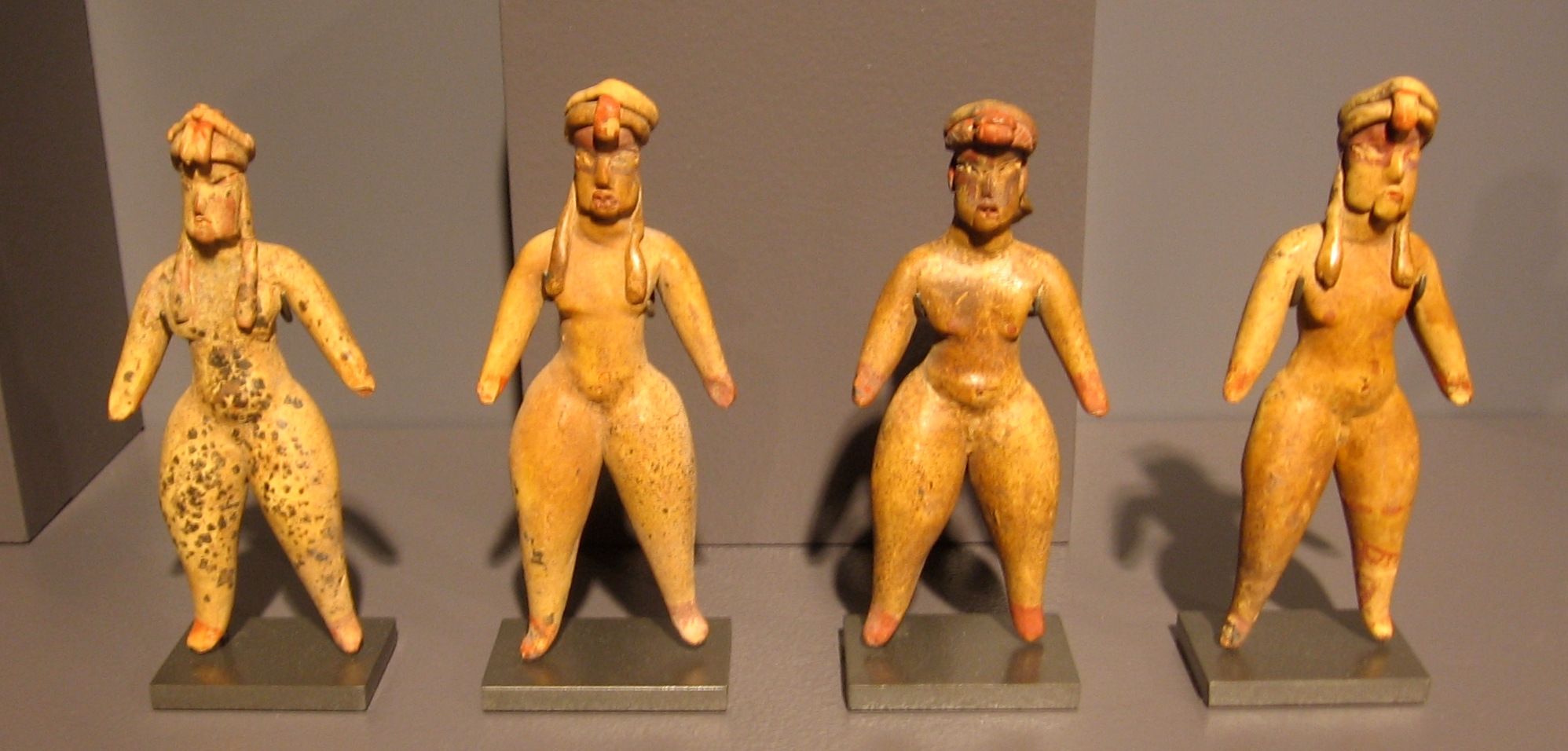
Four ceramic Tlapacoya figurines, 1500-1300 BCE.

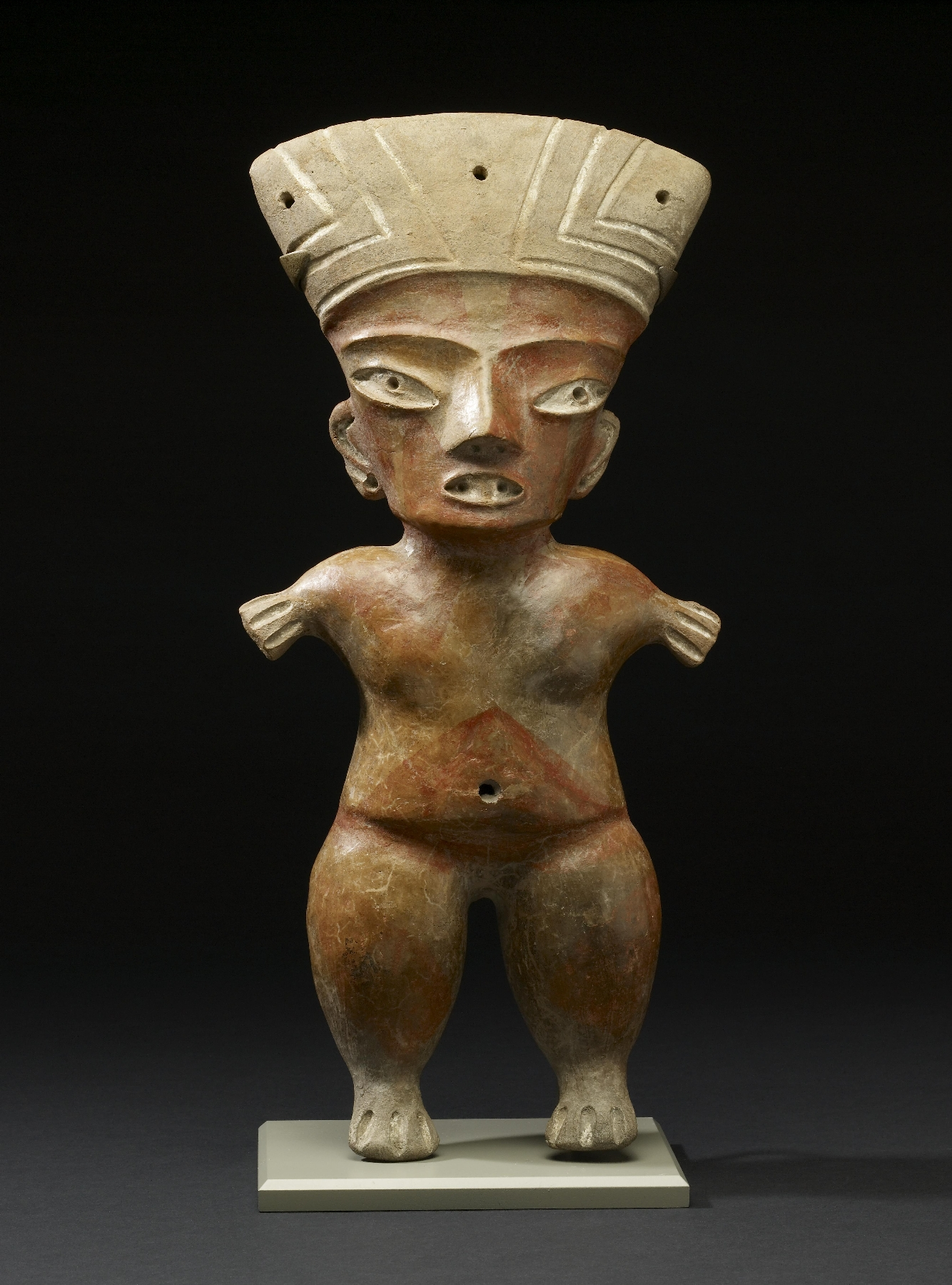
Tlapacoya style figurine, 1200-900 BC, Walters Art Museum

Clay Bowl, pigmented, 1200–900 BC, showing an Olmec-style design (from the Raymond and Laura Wielgus Collection, Indiana University Art Museum).

In addition to the figurines and other artifacts from the 1500 - 300 BCE era, human and animal remains have been found, some of which could be as much as 25,000 years old.

The most controversial findings in Tlapacoya are artifacts which have been dated by some researchers to as early as 25,000 BP. If verified, these would be some of the earliest dates for human habitation in the Americas and would discredit prevailing theories of the timing of settlement of the New World.

The evidence for these much-earlier dates consists of the bones of black bear and two species of deer which appeared in middens associated with 22,000-year-old hearths, as well as a curved obsidian blade which was found beneath a buried tree trunk. The bones were 24,000 years BP (± 4000 years) and 21,700 years BP (± 500 years). The obsidian blade was found under a tree trunk which dated to 24,000 years BP (± 1000 years) and was itself dated, using the obsidian hydration method, to between 21,250 and 25,000 years BP.

The site was uncovered during the construction of a Mexico City-Puebla freeway and has since been almost obliterated by freeway construction. In 1955, Beatriz Barba, "the first Mexican woman to obtain the title of archaeologist", earned her master's degree with a study of the site. Her thesis, Tlapacoya: un sitio preclásico de transición (Tlapacoya: a pre-classic transitional site) evaluated the social development and religious practices of the Tlatilco culture. Barba's evaluation of the site was one of the first to evaluate the socio-economic and political life of the inhabitants of Tlapacoya within the context of the history of the region, as well as their trade relationships and the influence of other groups upon the development of the Tlatilco people.

=== Human remains ===
Silvia González et al. have published research claiming that "one Tlapacoya skull is the first directly dated human in Mexico with an age of 9730 ± 65 years BP" (before present).

== See also ==
- Chiquihuite cave
- White Sands National Park
- Zohapilco
- Human antiquity in Mesoamerica
- Christine Niederberger Betton
