= Chiquirines =

- Location within Guatemala
- Coordinates: 14°33′57″N 92°03′18″W
- Country: Guatemala
- Department: Retalhuleu Department

Chiquirines is an ancient Pre-Columbian archaeological site, located in the modern-day Retalhuleu Department, Guatemala. It is located near the major Preclassic Period site of Ujuxte and is considered to be a satellite of that city and contemporary with it. Chiquirines features a smaller copy of a complex at Ujuxte, consisting of seven mounds arranged around a central plaza upon a basal platform. The largest of these mounds had a stairway ascending the west side. Broken fragments of sculpture have been found at Chiquirines.

Chiquirines was discovered during a regional survey undertaken during the 1993–1994 field seasons at Ujuxte. The site is situated 5.3 kilometres (3.3 mi) to the northwest of Ujuxte. Archaeologist Michael Love has mapped more than 40 mounds at Chiquirines. Ceramic finds at Chiquirines date to the same period as those at Ujuxte and confirm that the two sites were contemporary.

Chiquirines is the pluralised Spanish name, of Nahuatl origin, of the cicada species Odopoea imbellis.
