= Aztatlan =

Mesoamerican culture and trade network (~900 AD)

Aztatlán is a pre-Hispanic culture and trade tradition in Mesoamerica that occurred during the Post-classic period, from around AD 850 to 1350+. The Aztatlán region spanned the modern Mexican states of Sinaloa, Nayarit, and Jalisco as well as some portions of Durango, Zacatecas, and Michoacán. Elites living in the coastal and highland began having marriage alliances which facilitated the trade of prestige goods between the two areas. Colorful feathers, cacao, cotton, obsidian, and maguey-fiber were commonly traded.

There is some confusion as to if Aztatlán represents the mythical Aztlán, but without any evidence, there is no scientific basis to associate these two words. One is used for scholarly studies about a specific culture, one as a mystical place of origin. Aztatlán-style archeological artifacts dated to 900 AD were discovered in 2022 around Mazatlán 'place of deer'.
