= Ujuxte =

Preclassic Mayan archaeological site in Guatemala

Coordinates: 14.5385°N 92.0353°W

Ujuxte and other Preclassic Maya sites, western Central America.

The site of Ujuxte after the Ramón or Breadnut tree (Brosimum alicastrum)) is the largest Preclassic Maya site to be discovered on the Guatemalan Pacific coast. It is in the Retalhuleu Department, in western Guatemala.

== Site ==
The site includes approximately two hundred earthen mounds spread over some 200 hectares (494 acres) of farmland. Located 12 kilometres (7.5 mi) from the Pacific Ocean, the site is of particular importance because there has been no Preclassic site of comparable size and period of occupation excavated in this region. The site was probably founded about 1200 BC and was occupied until about AD 200, when it was apparently abandoned in favor of Takalik Abaj, to the east.

The two largest mounds are the focus of the central plaza which is oriented to the raising of the sun on the mornings of the spring and fall equinoxes. Mound 1 is 20 metres (66 ft) in height and Mound 2 is 16 metres (52 ft) high. The plaza also consists of an early ballcourt formed by Mounds 3 and 4, each over 7 metres (23 ft) tall. Early occupation of the site was widespread, covering over 4 square kilometres (1.5 sq mi). Later growth filled in the open spaces, forming the current dense pattern of mounds seen today.

The central plaza appears to have a celestial alignment that coincides with the rise and fall of the Pleiades. Also, on the summer solstice the sun rises from behind the Tajumulco volcano on the eastern horizon, in a line directly over the plaza. The celestial alignment is only maintained in the central plaza, which is most likely the ceremonial center. The outer edges of the site, however, show no alignment, possibly representing a residential area. Several regional sites, contemporaneous and in proximity to Ujuxte, are smaller copies and appear to be secondary centers to Ujuxte, which indicate its importance and domination in the region.

== Study ==
The Ujuxte Archaeological Project was begun, by E. M. Shook and the Universidad de San Carlos de Guatemala, in order to amplify data on the Early and Middle Preclassic periods along the Pacific coastal plain of Guatemala and to investigate the key questions of regional prehistory following the collapse of La Blanca. The research at Ujuxte is centered on the study of the growth and collapse of early states in the region. One nearby secondary center, Chiquirines, had a focal grouping of mounds that replicated the principal grouping at Ujuxte.

== See also ==
- Mesoamerican chronology
