= Mesoamerican chronology =

Divides the history of pre-Columbian Mesoamerica into several periods

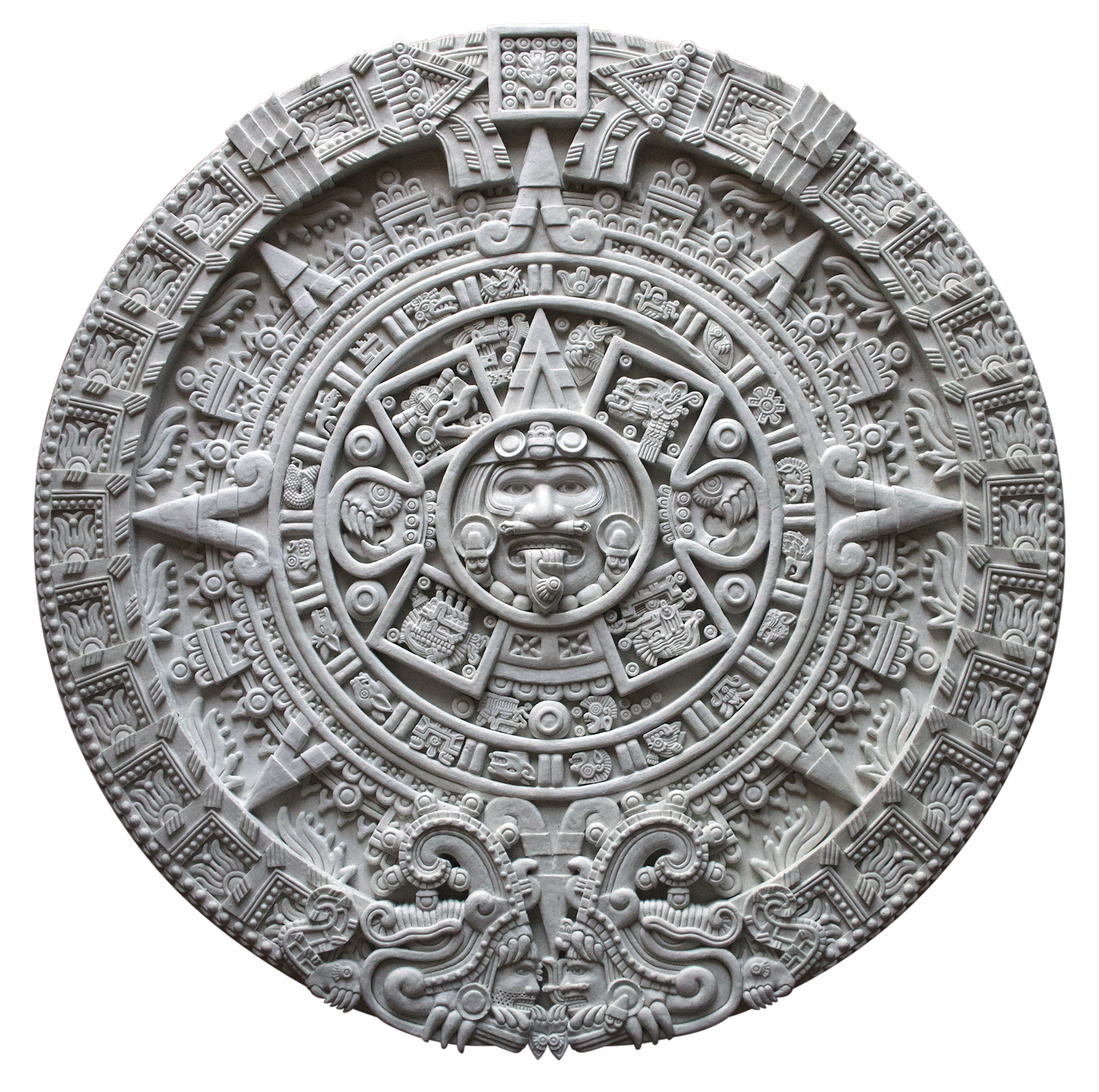
Aztec calendar (sunstone)

Mesoamerican chronology divides the history of prehispanic Mesoamerica into several periods: the Paleo-Indian (first human habitation until 3500 BCE), the Archaic (before 2600 BCE), the Pre-classic or Formative (2500 BCE – 250 CE), the Classic (250–900 CE), and the Postclassic (900–1521 CE), as well as the Colonial Period after European contact (1521–1821), and finally the Postcolonial, or the period after independence from Spain (1821–present).

The periodisation of Mesoamerica by researchers is based on archaeological, ethnohistorical, and modern cultural anthropology research dating to the early twentieth century. Archaeologists, ethnohistorians, historians, and cultural anthropologists continue to work to develop cultural histories of the region.

== Timeline ==
Summary of the chronology and cultures of Mesoamerica
Period	Timespan	Important cultures and cities
Paleo-Indian	10,000–3500 BCE	Honduras, Guatemala, Belize, obsidian and pyrite points, Iztapan, Chantuto Archaeological Site
Archaic	3500–2000 BCE	Agricultural settlements, Tehuacán
Preclassic (Formative)	2000 BCE–250 CE	Unknown culture in La Blanca and Ujuxte, Monte Alto culture, Mokaya culture
Early Preclassic	2000–1000 BCE	Olmec area: San Lorenzo Tenochtitlán; Central Mexico: Chalcatzingo; Valley of Oaxaca: San José Mogote. The Maya area: Nakbe, Cerros; West Mexico: Capacha
Middle Preclassic	950–400 BCE	Olmec area: La Venta, Tres Zapotes; Zoque area: Chiapa de Corzo; Maya area: El Mirador, Izapa, Lamanai, Naj Tunich, Takalik Abaj, Kaminaljuyú, Uaxactun; Valley of Oaxaca: Monte Albán, Dainzú; West Mexico: Capacha
Late Preclassic	400 BCE–250 CE	Zoque area: Chiapa de Corzo; Maya area: Kaminaljuyu, El Mirador, Uaxactun, Tikal, Edzná, Cival, San Bartolo, Altar de Sacrificios, Piedras Negras, Ceibal, Rio Azul; Central Mexico: Teotihuacan; Gulf Coast: Epi-Olmec culture West Mexico: Teuchitlan tradition, shaft tomb culture, Chupícuaro
Classic	250–900	Classic Maya Centers, Teotihuacan, Zapotec
Early Classic	250–600	Maya area: Calakmul, Caracol, Chunchucmil, Copán, Naranjo, Palenque, Quiriguá, Tikal, Uaxactun, Yaxha; Teotihuacan apogee; Zapotec apogee; Bajío apogee; Teuchitlan tradition
Late Classic	600–900	Maya area: Uxmal, Toniná, Cobá, Xunantunich, Waka', Pusilhá, Xultún, Dos Pilas, Cancuén, Aguateca, La Blanca; Central Mexico: Xochicalco, Cacaxtla, Cholula; Gulf Coast: El Tajín and Classic Veracruz culture
Terminal Classic	800–900/1000	Maya area: Puuc sites – Uxmal, Labna, Sayil, Kabah; Petén Basin sites – Seibal, El Chal
Postclassic	900–1521	Aztec, Tarascans, Mixtec, Totonac, Pipil, Itzá, Kowoj, K'iche', Kaqchikel, Poqomam, Mam, Aztatlán
Early Postclassic	900–1200	Tula, Mitla, Topoxte
Late Postclassic	1200–1521	Tenochtitlan, Cempoala, Tzintzuntzan, Mayapán, Tiho, Q'umarkaj, Iximche, Mixco Viejo, Tulum, Zaculeu
Colonial	1521–1821	Nahuas, Maya, Mixtec, Zapotec, Purépecha, Chinantec, Otomi, Tepehua, Totonac, Mazatec, Tlapanec, Amuzgo
Postcolonial	1821–present	Nahuas, Maya, Mixtec, Zapotec, Purépecha, Chinantec, Otomi, Tepehua, Totonac, Mazatec, Tlapanec, Amuzgo

== Overview ==
=== Paleo-Indian period ===
18,000–8000 BCE

The Paleo-Indian or Lithic period) is that which spans from the first signs of human presence in the region, which many believe to have happened due to the Beringian land bridge, to the establishment of agriculture and other practices (e.g. pottery, permanent settlements) and subsistence economies characteristic of proto-civilizations. In Mesoamerica, the termination of this phase and its transition into the succeeding Archaic period may generally be reckoned at between 10,000 and 8000 BCE. This dating is approximate only, and different timescales may be used between fields and subfields.

=== Archaic Period ===
8000 – 2600 BCE

During the Archaic Era agriculture was developed in the region and permanent villages were established. Late in this era, use of pottery and loom weaving became common, and class divisions began to appear. Many of the basic technologies of Mesoamerica in terms of stone-grinding, drilling, pottery etc. were established during this period.

=== Preclassic Period or Formative Period ===
2000 BCE – 250 CE

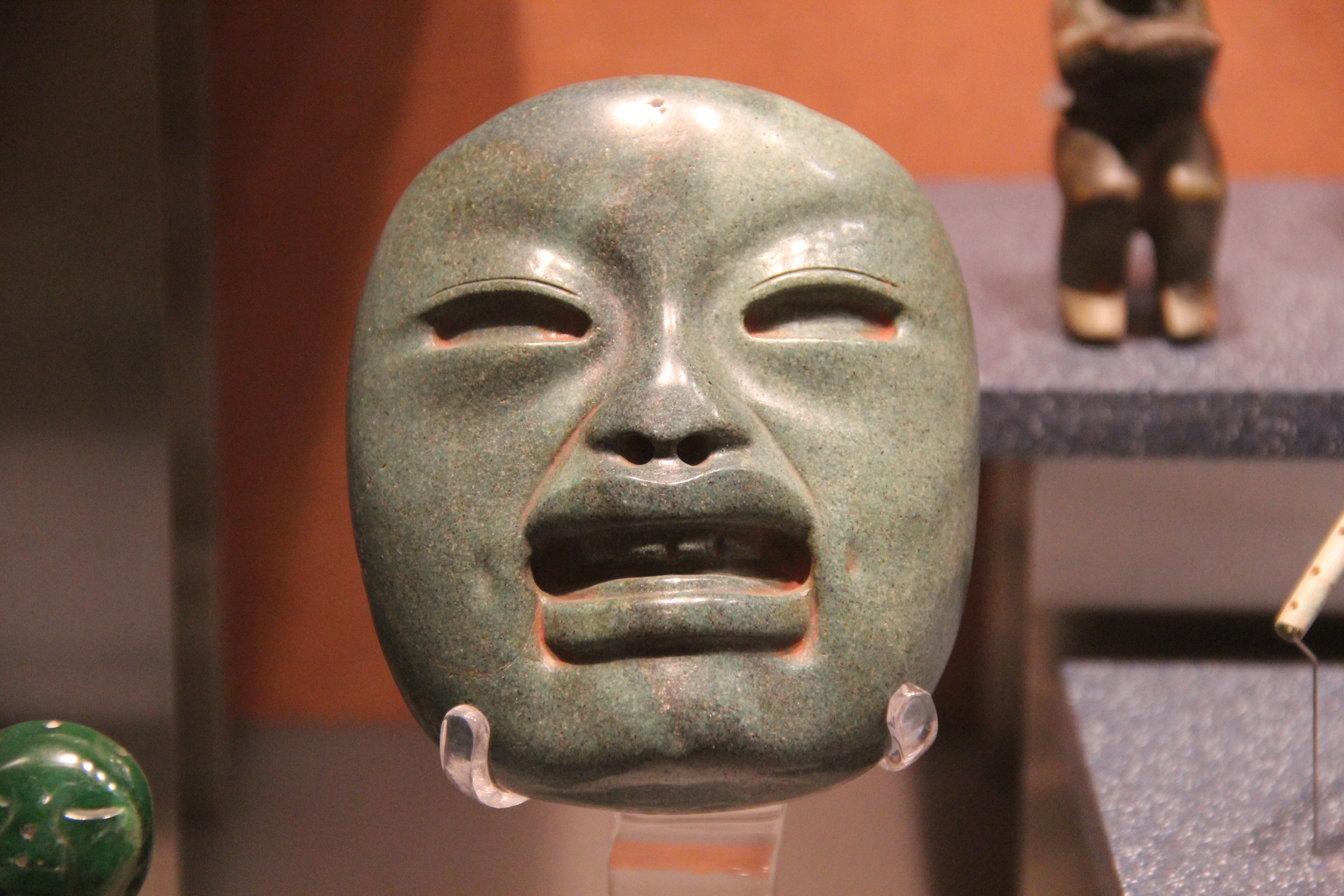
Olmec Stone Mask.

During the Preclassic Era, or Formative Period, large-scale ceremonial architecture, writing, cities, and states developed. Many of the distinctive elements of Mesoamerican civilization can be traced to this period, including the dominance of corn, the building of pyramids, human sacrifice, jaguar-worship, the complex calendar, and many of the gods.

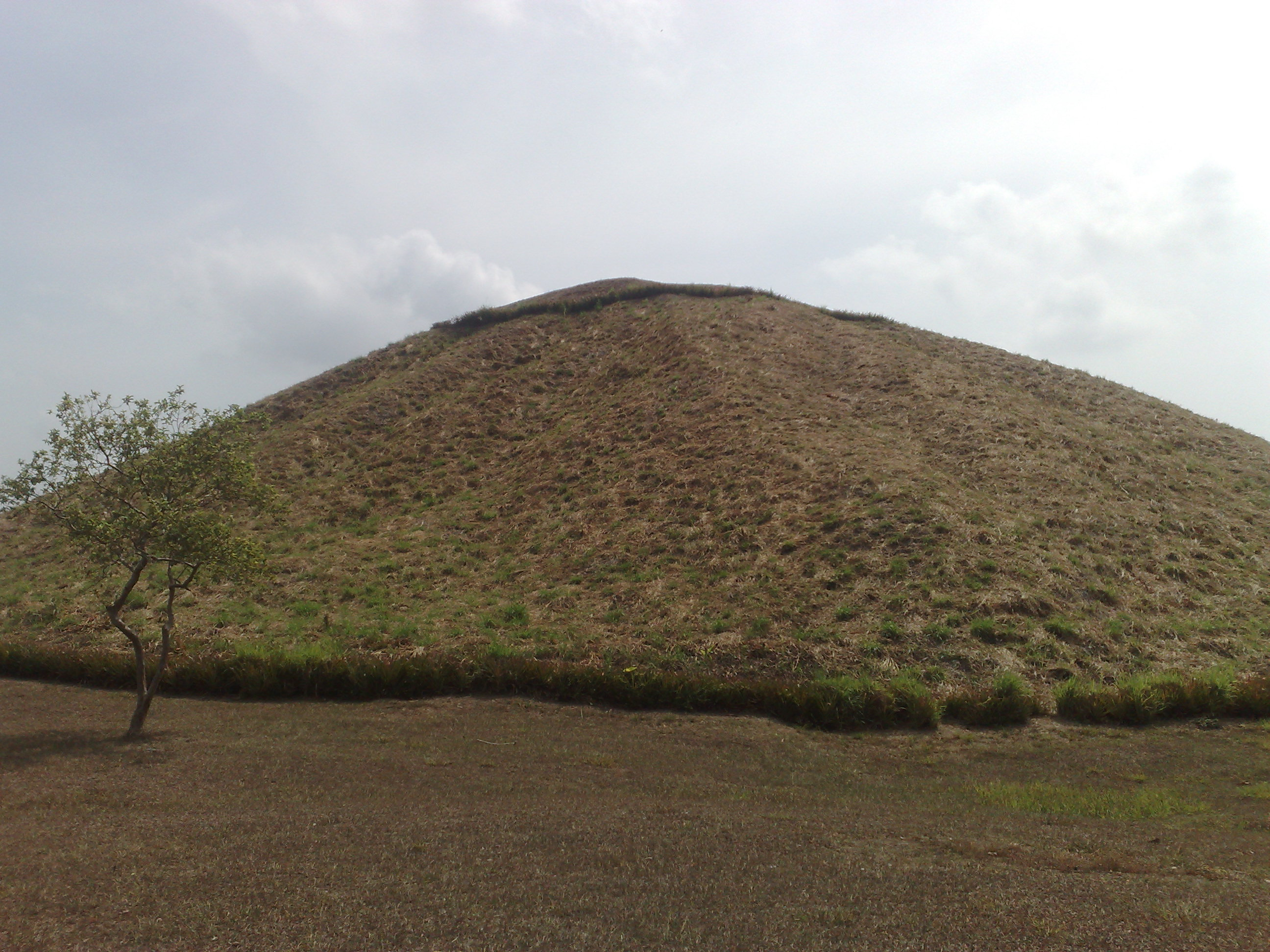
South face of the pyramid in La venta, Mexico

The Olmec civilization developed and flourished at such sites as La Venta and San Lorenzo Tenochtitlán, eventually succeeded by the Epi-Olmec culture between 300 and 250 BCE. The Zapotec civilization arose in the Valley of Oaxaca, the Teotihuacan civilization arose in the Valley of Mexico. The Maya civilization began to develop in the Mirador Basin (in modern-day Guatemala) and the Epi-Olmec culture in the Isthmus of Tehuantepec (in modern-day Chiapas), later expanding into Guatemala and the Yucatan Peninsula.

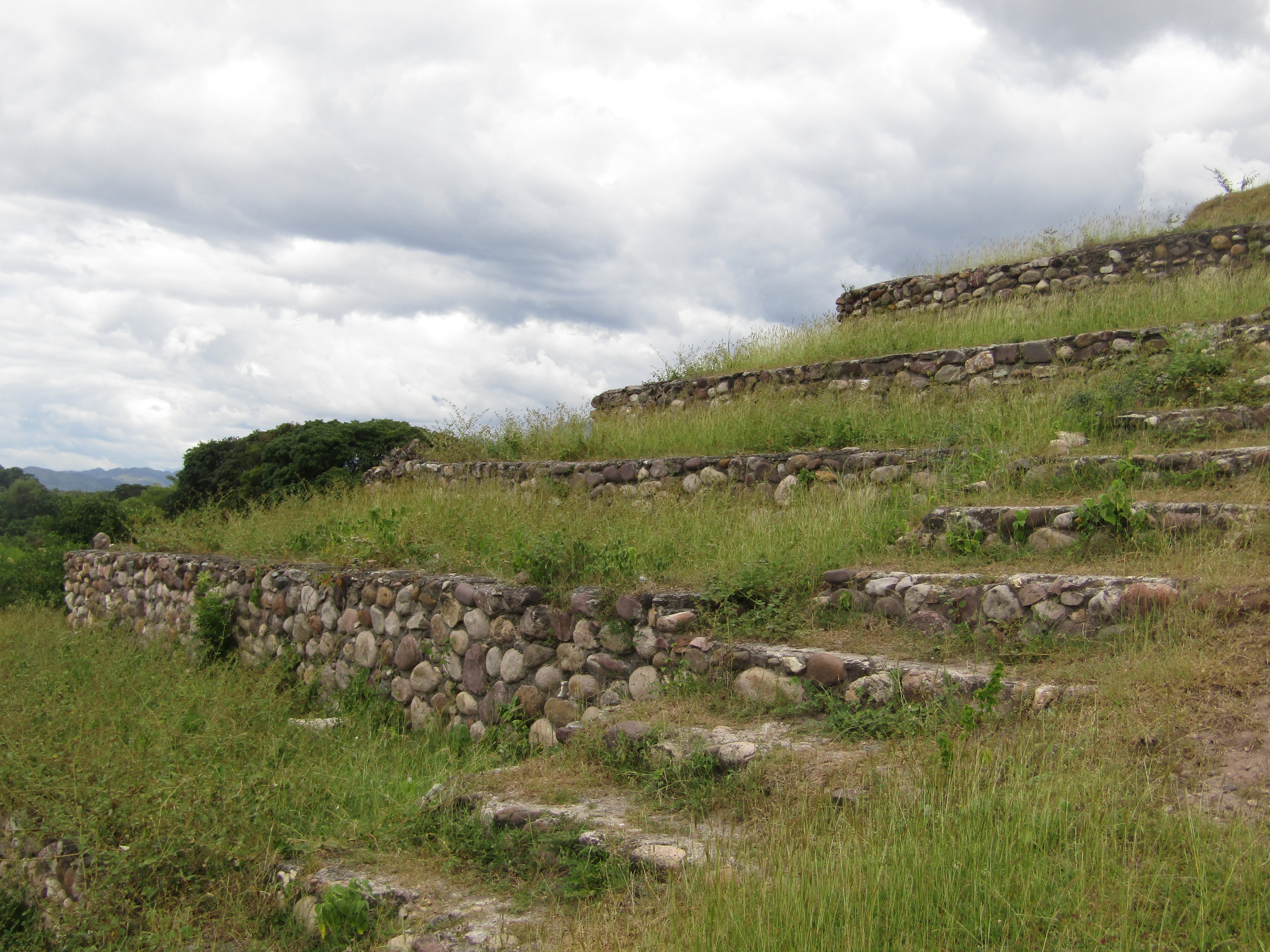
Structure 102 in Yarumela.

In Central America, there were some Olmec influences, the archaeological sites of Los Naranjos and Yarumela in Honduras stand out, built by ancestors of the Lencas, which reflect an architectural influence of this culture on Central American soil. Other sites with possible Olmec influence have been reported, such as Puerto Escondido, in the Sula Valley, near La Lima, and Hato Viejo in the department of Olancho, where a jadeite statuette has been found that shares many characteristics with those found in Mexico.

=== Classic Period ===
250 – 900 CE

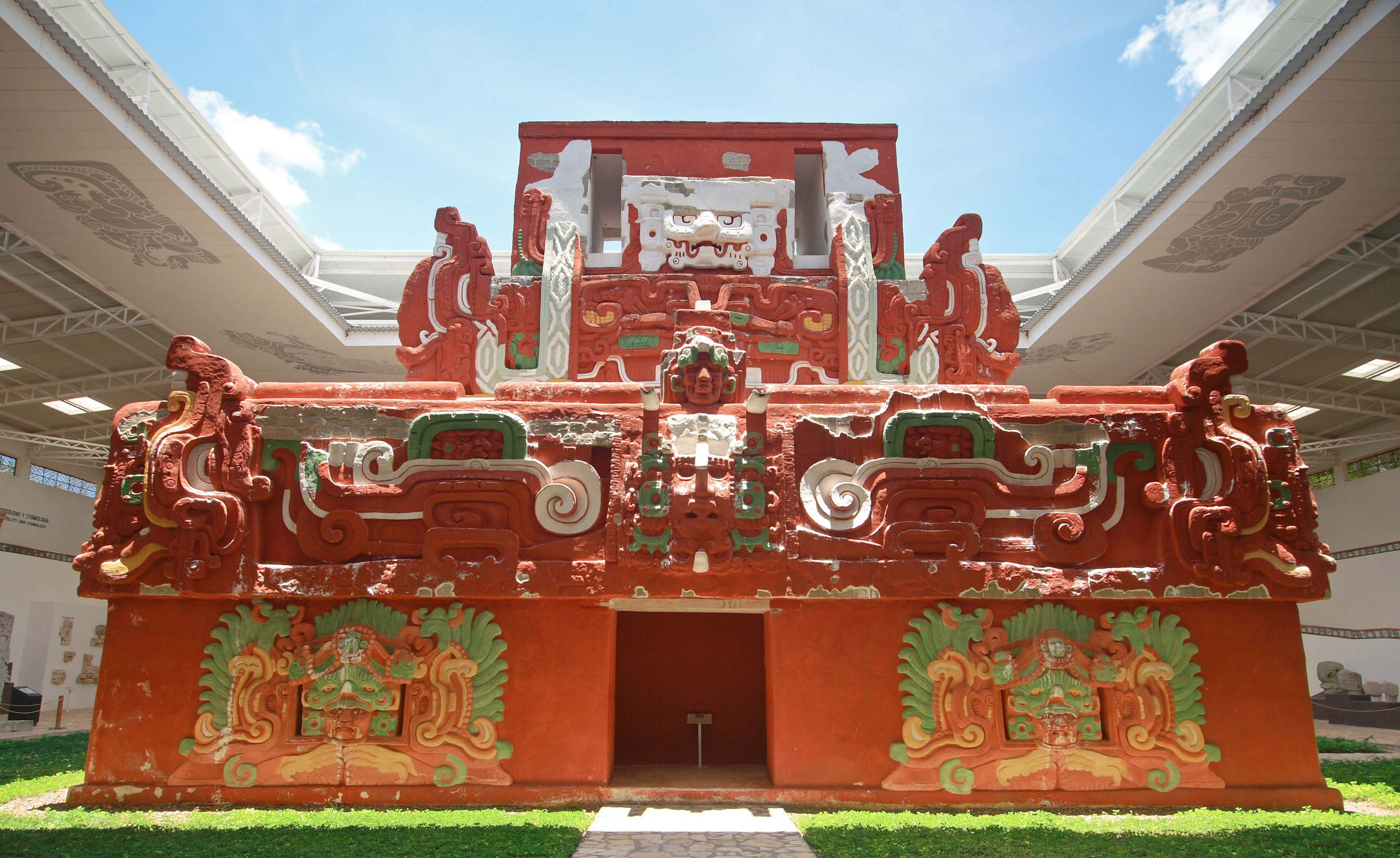
Recreation of Temple Rosalila at the Museum of Maya Sculpture, Honduras

The Classic Period was dominated by numerous independent city-states in the Maya region and also featured the beginnings of political unity in central Mexico and the Yucatán. Regional differences between cultures grew more manifest. The city-state of Teotihuacan dominated the Valley of Mexico until the early 8th century, but little is known of the political structure of the region because the Teotihuacanos left no written records. The city-state of Monte Albán dominated the Valley of Oaxaca until the late Classic, leaving limited records in the Zapotec script, which is as yet mostly undeciphered. Highly sophisticated arts such as stuccowork, architecture, sculptural reliefs, mural painting, pottery, and lapidary developed and spread during the Classic era.

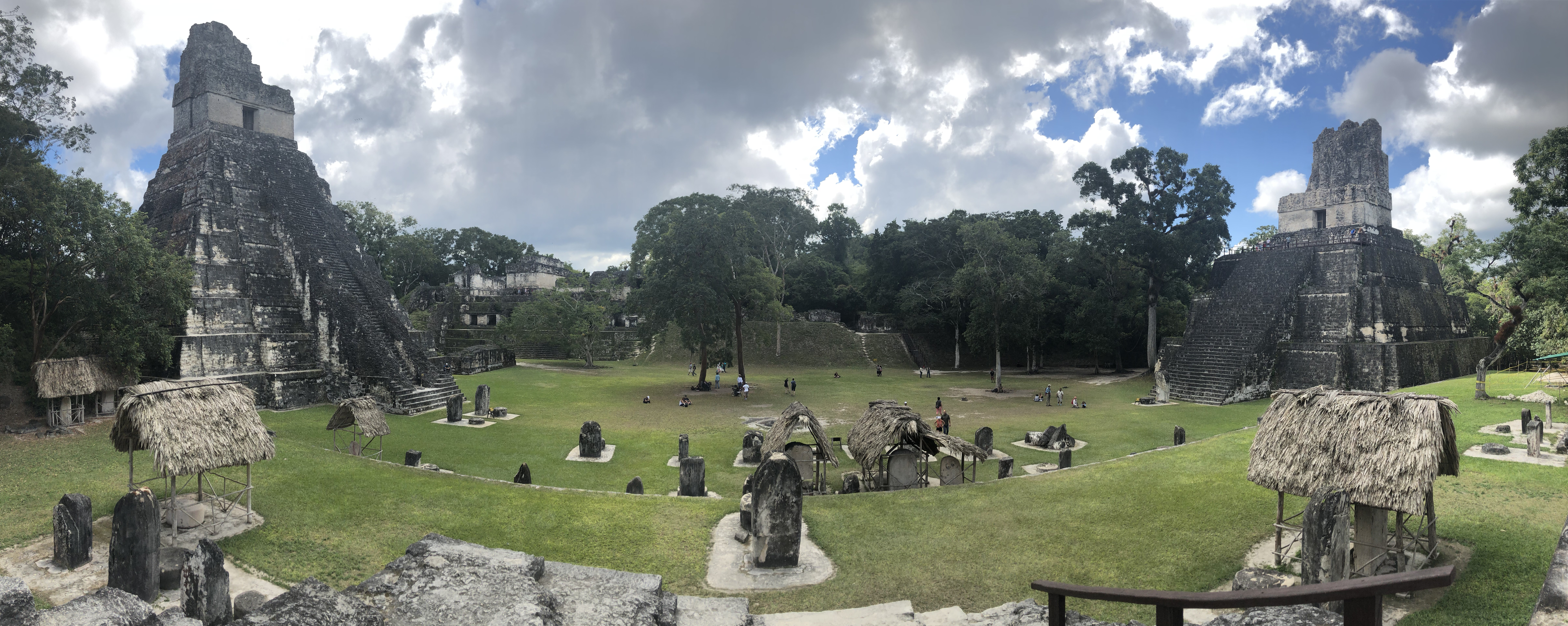
Tikal ruins, Guatemala.

In the Maya region, under considerable military influence by Teotihuacan after the "arrival" of Siyaj Kʼakʼ in 378 CE, numerous city states such as Tikal, Uaxactun, Calakmul, Copán, Quiriguá, Palenque, Cobá, and Caracol reached their zeniths. Each of these polities was generally independent, although they often formed alliances and occasionally became vassal states of one another. The main conflict during this period was the Tikal–Calakmul wars, which stretched over the course of more than half a millennium. These states declined during the Classic Maya collapse and were eventually abandoned.

=== Postclassic Period ===
900 – 1521 CE

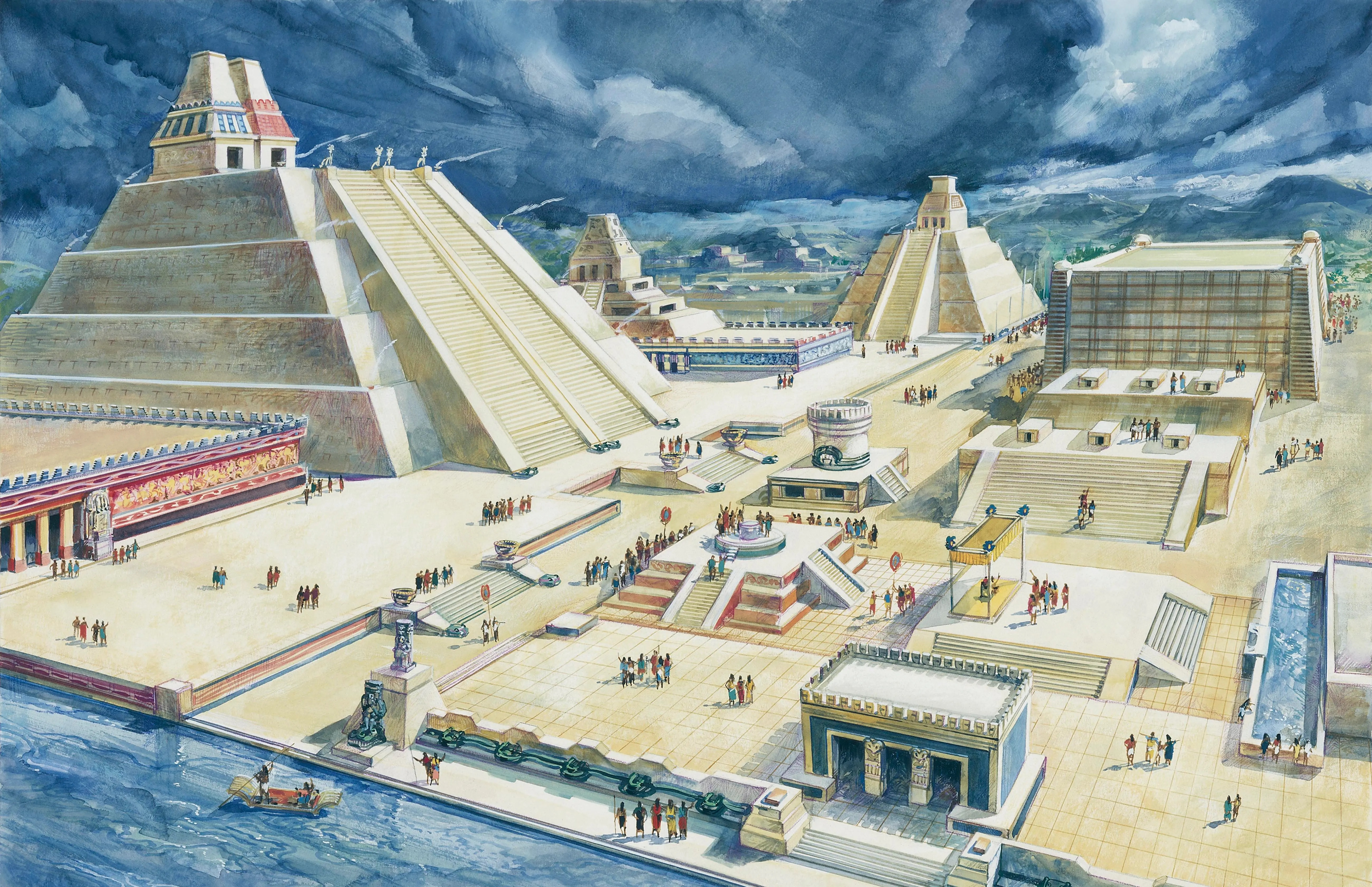
Recreation of Tenochtitlan by Diego Rivera.

In the Postclassic Period many of the great nations and cities of the Classic Era collapsed, although some continued, such as in Oaxaca, Cholula, and the Maya of Yucatan, such as at Chichen Itza and Uxmal. This is sometimes thought to have been a period of increased chaos and warfare.

The Postclassic is often viewed as a period of cultural decline. However, it was a time of technological advancement in architecture, engineering, and weaponry. Metallurgy (introduced c. 800) came into use for jewelry and some tools, with new alloys and techniques being developed in a few centuries. The Postclassic was a period of rapid movement and population growth—especially in Central Mexico post-1200—and of experimentation in governance. For instance, in Yucatan, 'dual rulership' apparently replaced the more theocratic governments of Classic times, while oligarchic councils operated in much of central Mexico. Likewise, it appears that the wealthy pochteca (merchant class) and military orders became more powerful than was apparently the case in Classic times. This afforded some Mesoamericans a degree of social mobility.

The Toltec for a time dominated central Mexico in the 9th–10th century, then collapsed. The northern Maya were for a time united under Mayapan. Oaxaca was briefly united by Mixtec rulers in the 11th–12th centuries.

The Aztec Empire arose in the early 15th century and appeared to be on a path to asserting dominance over the Valley of Mexico region not seen since Teotihuacan. By the 15th century, the Mayan 'revival' in Yucatan and southern Guatemala and the flourishing of Aztec imperialism evidently enabled a renaissance of fine arts and science. Examples include the 'Pueblan-Mexica' style in pottery, codex illumination, and goldwork, the flourishing of Nahua poetry, and the botanical institutes established by the Aztec elite.

Spain was the first European power to contact Mesoamerica. Its conquistadors, aided by numerous native allies, conquered the Aztecs.

=== Colonial Period ===
1521 – 1821 CE

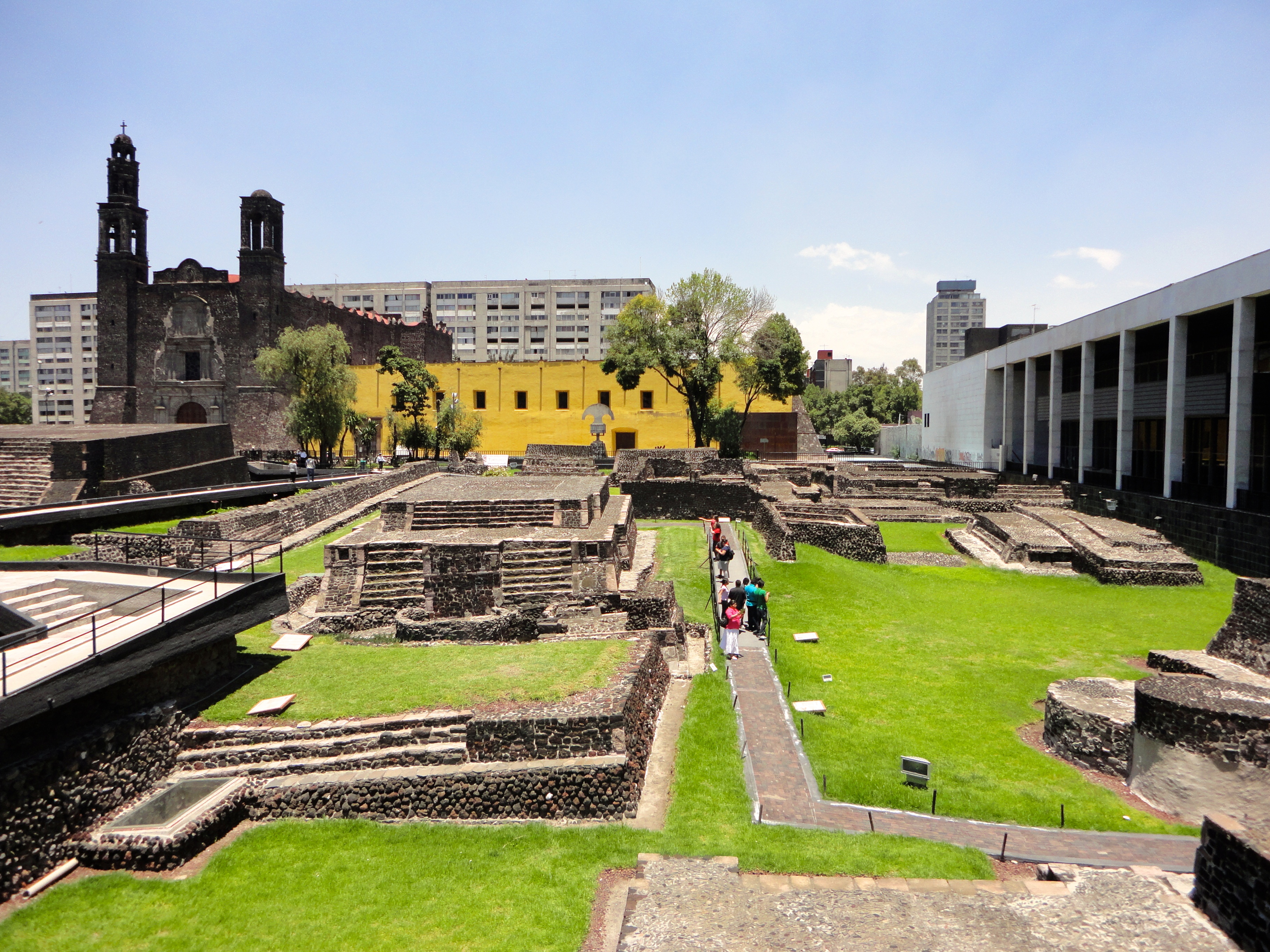
Archaeological zone of Tlatelolco, the Church on the ruins exemplifies the process of change from the post-classic period to the colonial period.

The Colonial Period was initiated with the Spanish conquest (1519–1521), which ended the hegemony of the Aztec Empire. It was accomplished with Spaniards' strategic alliances with enemies of the empire, most especially Tlaxcala, but also Huexotzinco, Xochimilco, and even Texcoco, a former partner in the Aztec Triple Alliance.

Although not all parts of Mesoamerica were brought under control of the Spanish Empire immediately, the defeat of the Aztecs marked the dramatic beginning of an inexorable process of conquest in Mesoamerica and incorporation that Spain completed in the mid-seventeenth century.

Indigenous peoples did not disappear, although their numbers were greatly reduced in the sixteenth century by new infectious diseases brought by the Spanish invaders; they suffered high mortality from slave labor, and during epidemics. The fall of Tenochtitlan marked the beginning of the three-hundred-year colonial period and the imposition of Spanish rule.

== Cultural horizons of Mesoamerica ==
Mesoamerican civilisation was a complex network of different cultures. As seen in the time-line below, these did not necessarily occur at the same time. The processes that gave rise to each of the cultural systems of Mesoamerica were very complex and not determined solely by the internal dynamics of each society. External as well as endogenous factors influenced their development. Among these factors, for example, were the relations between human groups and between humans and the environment, human migrations, and natural disasters.

Historians and archaeologists divide pre-Hispanic Mesoamerican history into three periods. The Spanish conquest of the Aztec empire (1519–1521) marks the end of indigenous rule and the incorporation of indigenous peoples as subjects of the Spanish Empire for the 300 year colonial period. The postcolonial period began with Mexican independence in 1821 and continues to the present day. European conquest did not end the existence of Mesoamerica's indigenous peoples, but did subject them to new political regimes. In the chart below of prehispanic cultures, the dates mentioned are approximations, and that the transition from one period to another did not occur at the same time nor under the same circumstances in all societies.

=== Preclassic Period ===
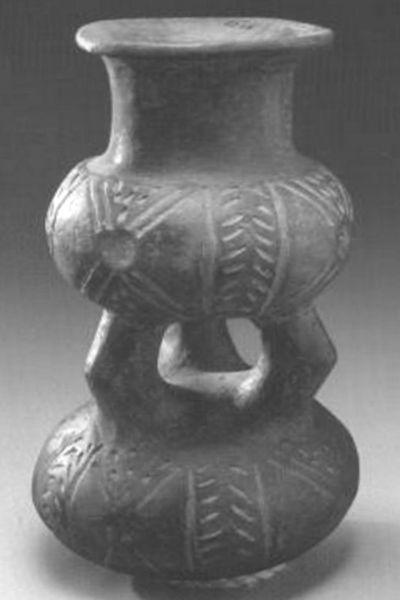
Vessel from the Capacha culture, found in Acatitan, Colima.

The Preclassic period ran from 2500 BCE to 200 CE. Its beginnings are marked by the development of the first ceramic traditions in the West, specifically at sites such as Matanchén, Nayarit, and Puerto Marqués, in Guerrero. Some authors hold that the early development of pottery in this area is related to the ties between South America and the coastal peoples of Mexico. The advent of ceramics is taken as an indicator of a sedentary society, and it signals the divergence of Mesoamerica from the hunter-gatherer societies in the desert to the north.

The Preclassic Era (also known as the Formative Period) is divided into three phases: the Early (2500–1200 BCE), Middle (1500–600 BCE), and Late (600 BCE – 200 CE). During the first phase, the manufacture of ceramics was widespread across the entire region, the cultivation of maize and vegetables became well-established, and society started to become socially stratified in a process that concluded with the appearance of the first hierarchical societies along the coast of the Gulf of Mexico. In the early Preclassic period, the Capacha culture acted as a driving force in the process of civilizing Mesoamerica, and its pottery spread widely across the region.

By 2500 BCE, small settlements were developing in Guatemala's Pacific Lowlands, places such as Tilapa, La Blanca, Ocós, El Mesak, Ujuxte, and others, where the oldest ceramic pottery from Guatemala have been found. From 2000 BCE a heavy concentration of pottery in the Pacific Coast Line has been documented. Recent excavations suggest that the Highlands were a geographic and temporal bridge between Early Preclassic villages of the Pacific coast and later Petén lowlands cities. In Monte Alto near La Democracia, Escuintla, in the Pacific lowlands of Guatemala, some giant stone heads and potbelly sculptures (barrigones) have been found, dated at c. 1800 BCE, of the so-named Monte Alto Culture.

Several of the most prominent Formative Period sites in the central Mexican plateau and Gulf Coast regions.

Around 1500 BCE, the cultures of the West entered a period of decline, accompanied by an assimilation into the other peoples with whom they had maintained connections. As a result, the Tlatilco culture emerged in the Valley of Mexico, and the Olmec culture in the Gulf. Tlatilco was one of the principal Mesoamerican population centers of this period. Its people were adept at harnessing the natural resources of Lake Texcoco and at cultivating maize. Some authors posit that Tlatilco was founded and inhabited by the ancestors of today's Otomi people.

The Olmecs, on the other hand, had entered into an expansionist phase that led them to construct their first works of monumental architecture at San Lorenzo and La Venta. The Olmecs exchanged goods within their own core area and with sites as far away as Guerrero and Morelos and present day Guatemala and Costa Rica. San José Mogote, a site that also shows Olmec influences, ceded dominance of the Oaxacan plateau to Monte Albán toward the end of the middle Preclassic Era. During this same time, the Chupícuaro culture flourished in Bajío, while along the Gulf the Olmecs entered a period of decline.

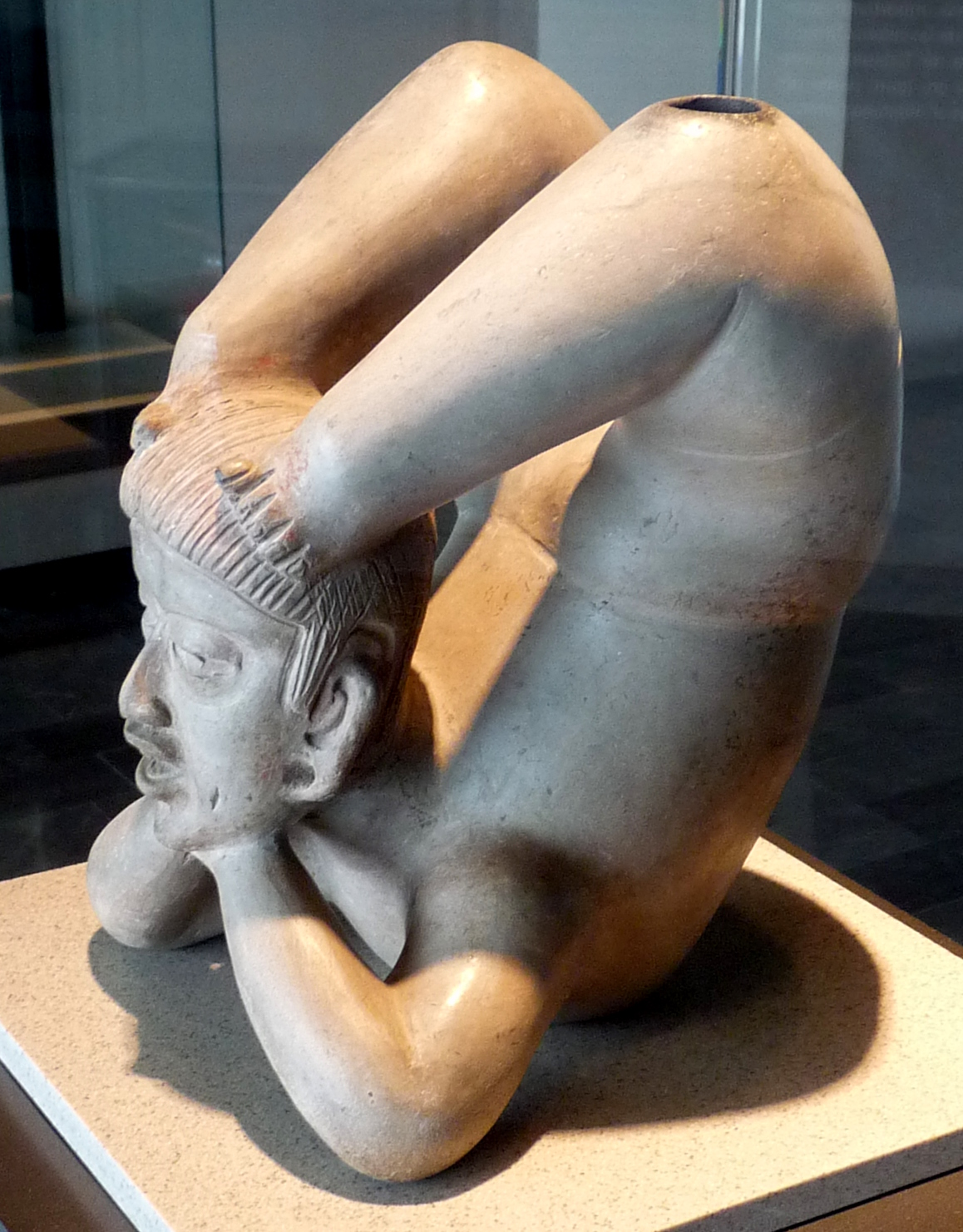
A typical Pre-Classic figurine from central Mexico, Tlatilco culture.

One of the great cultural milestones that marked the Middle Preclassic period is the development of the first writing system, by either the Maya, the Olmec, or the Zapotec. During this period, the Mesoamerican societies were highly stratified. The connections between different centers of power permitted the rise of regional elites that controlled natural resources and peasant labor. This social differentiation was based on the possession of certain technical knowledge, such as astronomy, writing, and commerce. Furthermore, the Middle Preclassic period saw the beginnings of the process of urbanization that would come to define the societies of the Classic period. In the Maya area, cities such as Nakbe c. 1000 BCE, El Mirador c. 650 BCE, Cival c. 350 BCE, and San Bartolo show the same monumental architecture of the Classic period. In fact, El Mirador is the largest Maya city. It has been argued that the Maya experienced a first collapse c. 100 CE, and resurged c. 250 in the Classic period. Some population centers such as Tlatilco, Monte Albán, and Cuicuilco flourished in the final stages of the Preclassic period. Meanwhile, the Olmec populations shrank and ceased to be major players in the area.

Toward the end of the Preclassic period, political and commercial hegemony shifted to the population centers in the Valley of Mexico. Around Lake Texcoco there existed a number of villages that grew into true cities: Tlatilco and Cuicuilco are examples. The former was found on the northern bank of the lake, while the latter was on the slopes of the mountainous region of Ajusco. Tlatilco maintained strong relationships with the cultures of the West, so much so that Cuicuilco controlled commerce in the Maya area, Oaxaca, and the Gulf coast. The rivalry between the two cities ended with the decline of Tlatilco. Meanwhile, at Monte Albán in the Valley of Oaxaca, the Zapotec had begun developing culturally independent of the Olmec, adopting aspects of that culture but making their own contributions as well. On the southern coast of Guatemala, Kaminaljuyú advanced in the direction of what would be the Classic Maya culture, even though its links to Central Mexico and the Gulf would initially provide their cultural models. Apart from the West, where the tradition of the Tumbas de tiro had taken root, in all the regions of Mesoamerica the cities grew in wealth, with monumental constructions carried out according to urban plans that were surprisingly complex. The circular pyramid of Cuicuilco dates from this time, as well as the central plaza of Monte Albán, and the Pyramid of the Moon in Teotihuacan.

Around the start of the common era, Cuicuilco had disappeared, and the hegemony over the Mexican basin had passed to Teotihuacan. The next two centuries marked the period in which the so-called city of the gods consolidated its power, becoming the premier Mesoamerican city of the first millennium, and the principal political, economic, and cultural center for the next seven centuries.

==== The Olmec ====
The Olmec heartland.

For many years, the Olmec culture was thought to be the 'mother culture' of Mesoamerica, because of the great influence that it exercised throughout the region. However, more recent perspectives consider this culture to be more of a process to which all the contemporary peoples contributed, and which eventually crystallized on the coasts of Veracruz and Tabasco. The ethnic identity of the Olmecs is still widely debated. Based on linguistic evidence, archaeologists and anthropologists generally believe that they were either speakers of an Oto-Manguean language, or (more likely) the ancestors of the present-day Zoque people who live in the north of Chiapas and Oaxaca. According to this second hypothesis, Zoque tribes emigrated toward the south after the fall of the major population centers of the Gulf plains. Whatever their origin, these bearers of Olmec culture arrived at the leeward shore some eight thousand years BCE, entering like a wedge among the fringe of proto-Maya peoples who lived along the coast, a migration that would explain the separation of the Huastecs of the north of Veracruz from the rest of the Maya peoples based in the Yucatán Peninsula and Guatemala.

The Olmec culture represents a milestone of Mesoamerican history, as various characteristics that define the region first appeared there. Among them are the state organization, the development of the 260-day ritual calendar and the 365-day secular calendar, the first writing system, and urban planning. The development of this culture started 1600 to 1500 BCE, though it continued to consolidate itself up to the 12th century BCE. Its principal sites were La Venta, San Lorenzo, and Tres Zapotes in the core region. However, throughout Mesoamerica numerous sites show evidence of Olmec occupation, especially in the Balsas River basin, where Teopantecuanitlan is located. This site is quite enigmatic, since it dates from several centuries earlier than the main populations of the Gulf, a fact which has continued to cause controversy and given rise to the hypothesis that the Olmec culture originated in that region.

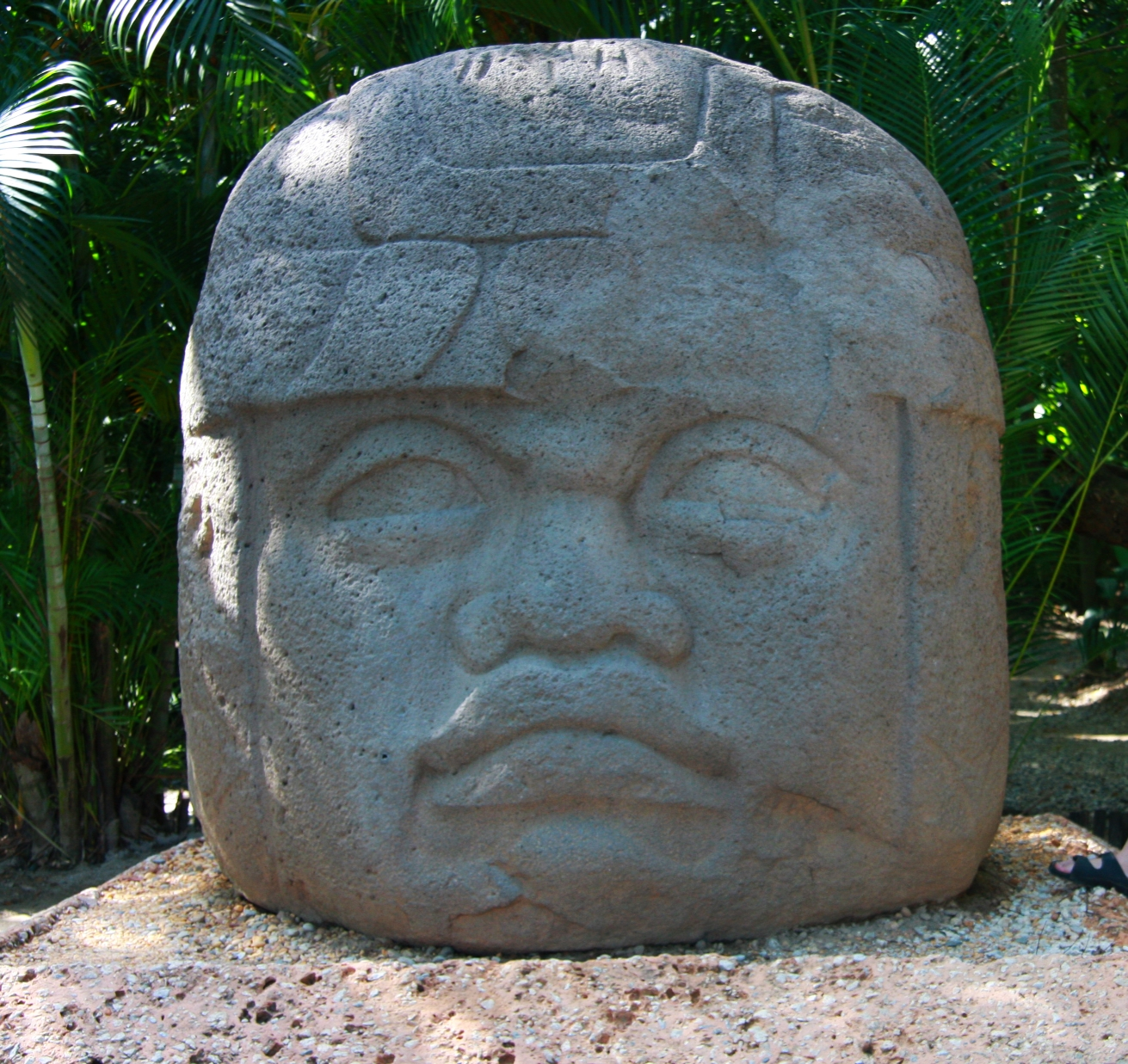
Olmec head, La Venta

Among the best-known expressions of Olmec culture are giant stone heads, sculptured monoliths up to three meters in height and several tons in weight. These feats of Olmec stonecutting are especially impressive when one considers that Mesoamericans lacked iron tools and that the heads are at sites dozens of kilometers from the quarries where their basalt was mined. The function of these monuments is unknown. Some authors propose that they were commemorative monuments for notable players of the ballgame, and others that they were images of the Olmec governing elite.

The Olmec are also known for their small carvings made of jade and other greenstones. So many of the Olmec figurines and sculptures contain representations of the were-jaguar, that, according to José María Covarrubias, they could be forerunners of the worship of the rain god, or maybe a predecessor of the future Tezcatlipoca in his manifestation as Tepeyolohtli, the "Heart of the Mountain"

The exact causes of the Olmec decline are unknown.

In the Pacific lowlands of the Maya Area, Takalik Abaj c. 800 BCE, Izapa c. 700 BCE, and Chocola c. 600 BCE, along with Kaminaljuyú c. 800 BCE, in the central Highlands of Guatemala, advanced in the direction of what would be the Classic Maya culture. Apart from the West, where the tradition of the Tumbas de tiro had taken root, in all the regions of Mesoamerica the cities grew in wealth, with monumental constructions carried out according to urban plans that were surprisingly complex. La Danta in El Mirador, the San Bartolo murals, and the circular pyramid of Cuicuilco date from this time, as do the central plaza of Monte Albán and the Pyramid of the Moon in Teotihuacan.

Toward the end of the Preclassic period, political and commercial hegemony shifted to the population centers in the Valley of Mexico. Around Lake Texcoco there existed a number of villages that grew into true cities: Tlatilco and Cuicuilco are examples. The former was found on the northern bank of the lake, while the latter was on the slopes of the mountainous region of Ajusco. Tlatilco maintained strong relationships with the cultures of the West, so much so that Cuicuilco controlled commerce in the Maya area, Oaxaca, and the Gulf coast. The rivalry between the two cities ended with the decline of Tlatilco. Meanwhile, at Monte Albán in Oaxaca, the Zapotec had begun developing culturally independent of the Olmec, adopting aspects of that culture and making their own contributions as well. In Peten, the great Classic Maya cities of Tikal, Uaxactun, and Seibal, began their growth at c. 300 BCE.

Cuicuilco's hegemony over the valley declined in the period 100 BCE to 1 CE. As Cuicuilco declined, Teotihuacan began to grow in importance. The next two centuries marked the period in which the so-called City of the gods consolidated its power, becoming the premier Mesoamerican city of the first millennium, and the principal political, economic, and cultural center in Central Mexico for the next seven centuries.

=== Classic period ===
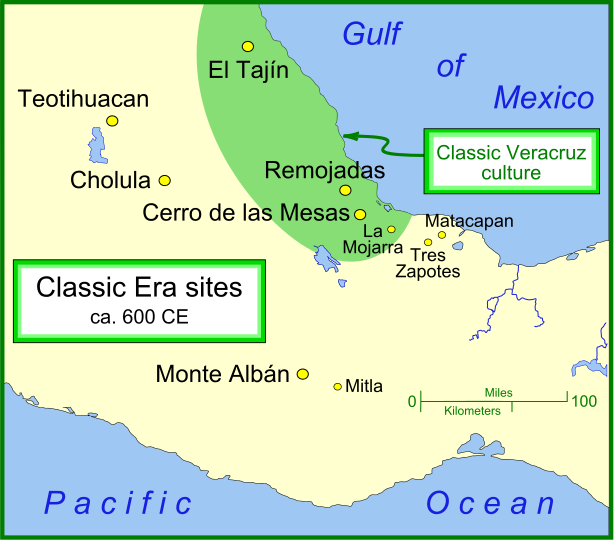
Important Classic Era settlements, circa 500 CE

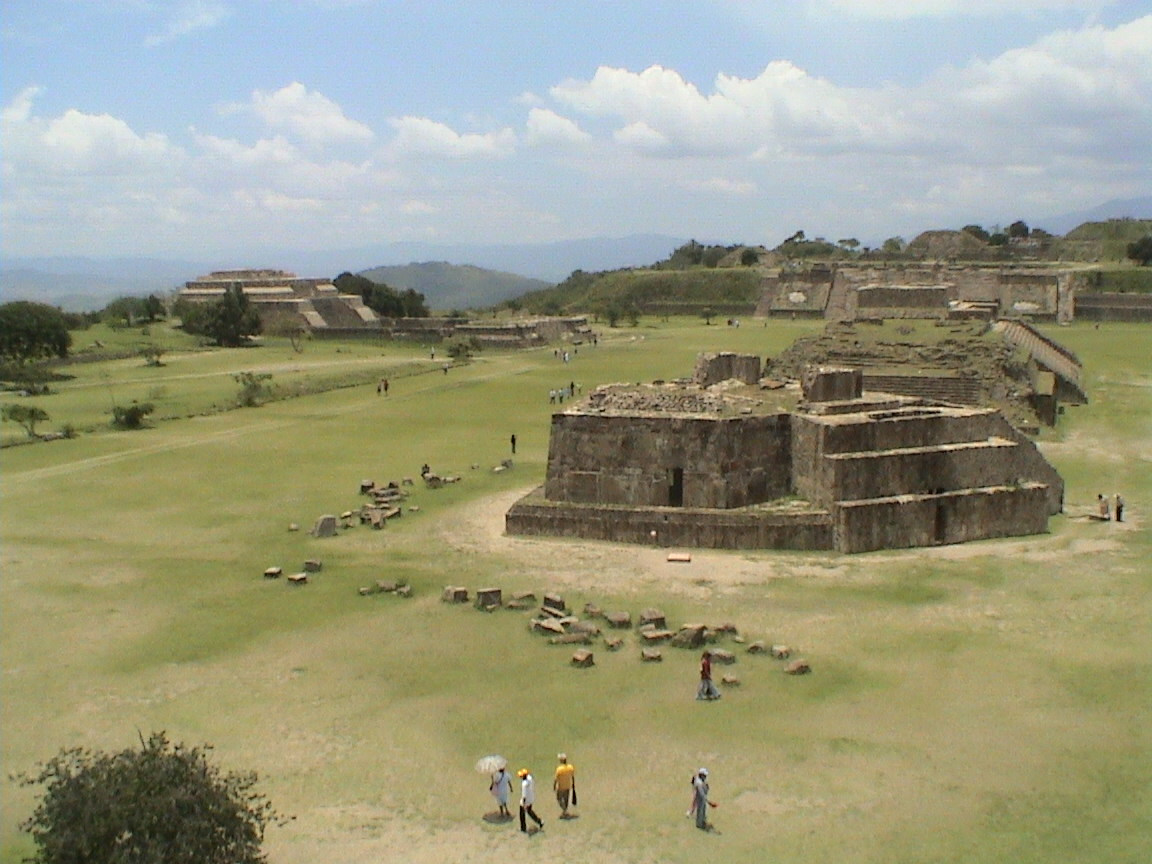
Central Plaza of Monte Albán, a city constructed on a hill that dominates the Central Valley of Oaxaca

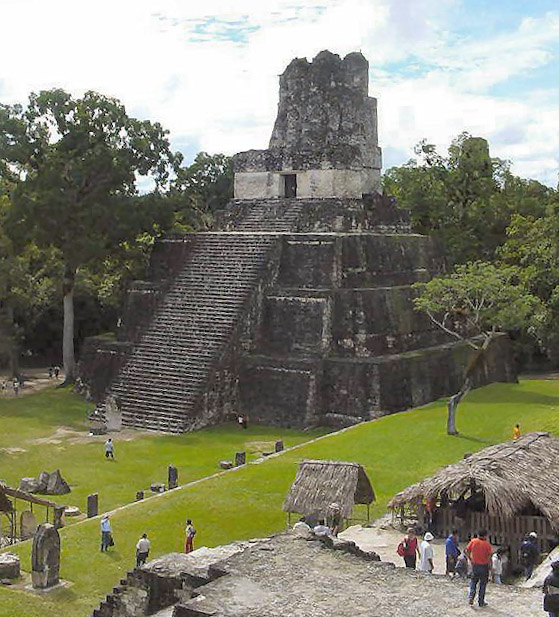
Temple 2, Tikal, Guatemala

The Classic period of Mesoamerica includes the years from 250 to 900 CE. The end point of this period varied from region to region: for example, in the center of Mexico it is related to the fall of the regional centers of the late Classic (sometimes called Epiclassic) period, toward the year 900; in the Gulf, with the decline of El Tajín, in the year 800; in the Maya area, with the abandonment of the highland cities in the 9th century; and in Oaxaca, with the disappearance of Monte Albán around 850. Normally, the Classic period in Mesoamerica is characterized as the stage in which the arts, science, urbanism, architecture, and social organization reached their peak. This period was also dominated by the influence of Teotihuacan throughout the region, and the competition between the different Mesoamerican states led to continuous warfare.

This period of Mesoamerican history can be divided into three phases. Early, from 250 to 550 CE; Middle, from 550 to 700; and Late, from 700 to 900. The early Classic period began with the expansion of Teotihuacan, which led to its control over the principal trade routes of northern Mesoamerica. During this time, the process of urbanization that started in the last centuries of the early Preclassic period was consolidated. The principal centers of this phase were Monte Albán, Kaminaljuyu, Ceibal, Tikal, and Calakmul, and then Teotihuacan, in which 80 per cent of the 200,000 inhabitants of the Lake Texcoco basin were concentrated.

The cities of this era were characterized by their multi-ethnic composition, which entailed the cohabitation in the same population centers of people with different languages, cultural practices, and places of origin. During this period the alliances between the regional political elites were strengthened, especially for those allied with Teotihuacan. Also, social differentiation became more pronounced: a small dominant group ruled over the majority of the population. This majority was forced to pay tribute and to participate in the building of public structures such as irrigation systems, religious edifices, and means of communication. The growth of the cities could not have happened without advances in agricultural methods and the strengthening of trade networks involving not only the peoples of Mesoamerica, but also the distant cultures of Oasisamerica.

The arts of Mesoamerica reached their high-point in this era. Especially notable are the Maya stelae (carved pillars), exquisite monuments commemorating the stories of the Royal families, the rich corpus of polychrome ceramics, mural painting, and music. In Teotihuacan, architecture made great advances: the Classic style was defined by the construction of pyramidal bases that sloped upward in a step-wise fashion. The Teotihuacan architectural style was reproduced and modified in other cities throughout Mesoamerica, the clearest examples being the Zapotec capital of Monte Alban and Kaminal Juyú in Guatemala. Centuries later, long after Teotihuacan was abandoned c. 700 CE, cities of the Postclassic era followed the style of Teotihuacan construction, especially Tula, Tenochtitlan, and Chichén Itzá.

Many scientific advances were also achieved during this period. The Maya refined their calendar, script, and mathematics to their highest level of development. Writing came to be used throughout the Mayan area, although it was still regarded as a noble activity and practiced only by noble scribes, painters, and priests. Using a similar system of writing, other cultures developed their own scripts, the most notable examples being those of the Ñuiñe culture and the Zapotecs of Oaxaca, although the Mayan system was the only fully developed writing system in Precolumbian America. Astronomy remained a matter of vital significance because of its importance for agriculture, the economic basis of Mesoamerican society, and to predict events in the future such as lunar and solar eclipses, an important feature for the rulers, proving to the commoners their links with the heavenly world.

The Middle Classic period ended in Northern Mesoamerica with the decline of Teotihuacan. This allowed other regional power centers to flourish and compete for control of trade routes and natural resources. In this way the late Classic era commenced. Political fragmentation during this era meant no city had complete hegemony. Various population movements occurred, caused by the incursion of groups from Aridoamerica and other northern regions, who pushed the older populations of Mesoamerica south. Among these new groups were the Nahua, who would later found the cities of Tula and Tenochtitlan, the two most important capitals of the Postclassic era. In addition, southern peoples established themselves in the center of Mexico, including the Olmeca-Xicallanca, who came from the Yucatán Peninsula and founded Cacaxtla and Xochicalco.

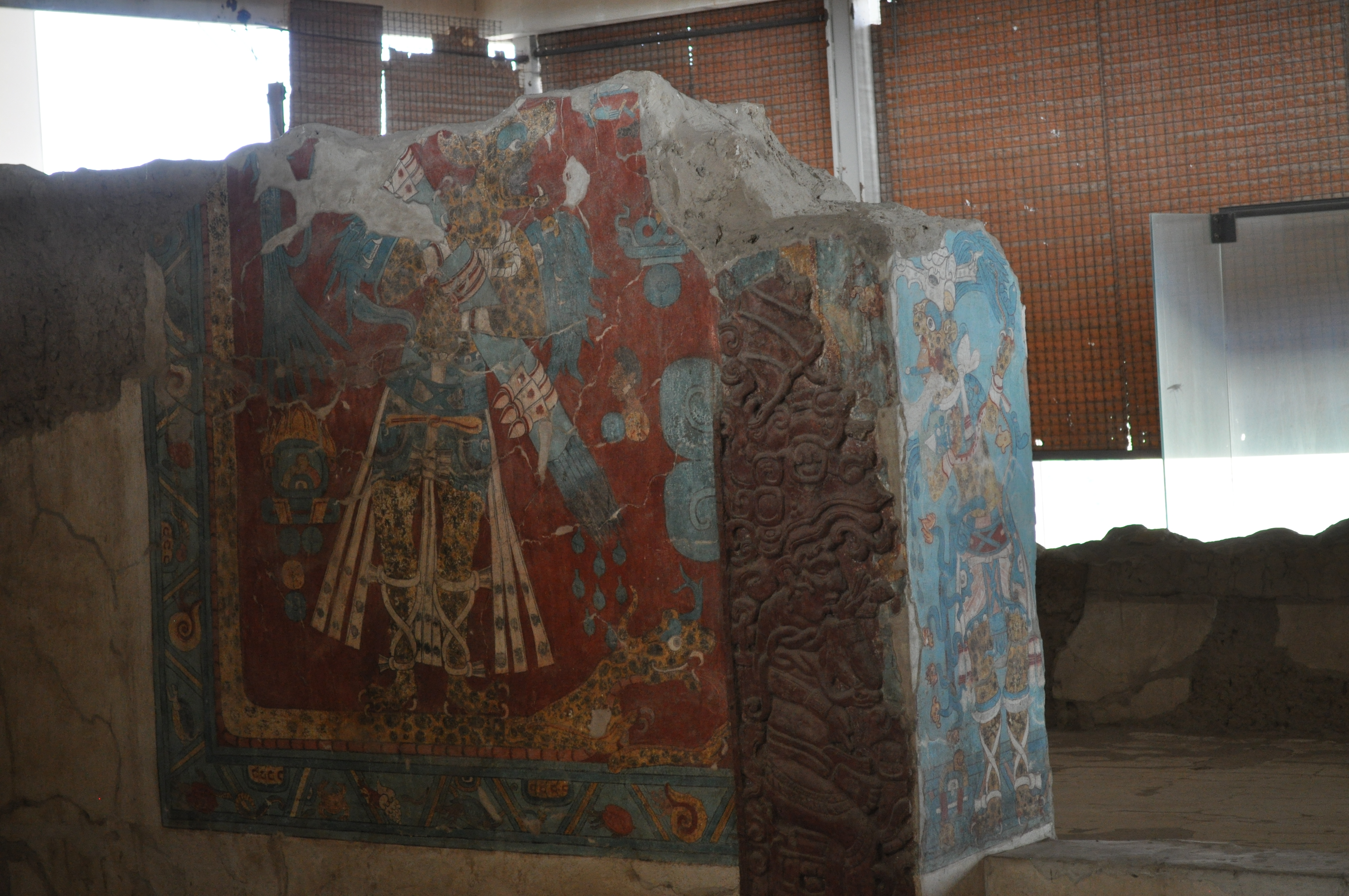
Mural of the Portic A, in Cacaxtla, Tlaxcala

In the Maya region, Tikal, an ally of Teotihuacan, experienced a decline, the so-called Tikal Hiatus, after being defeated by Dos Pilas, and Caracol, ally of Calakmul, lasted about another 100 years. During this hiatus, the cities of Dos Pilas, Piedras Negras, Caracol, Calakmul, Palenque, Copán, and Yaxchilán were consolidated. These and other city-states of the region found themselves involved in bloody wars with changing alliances, until Tikal defeated, in order, Dos Pilas, Caracol, with the help of Yaxha and El Naranjo, Waka, Calakmul's last ally, and finally Calakmul itself, an event that took place in 732 with the sacrifice of Yuknom Cheen's son in Tikal. That led to construction of monumental architecture in Tikal, from 740 to 810; the last date documented there was 899. The ruin of the Classic Maya civilization in the northern lowlands, begun at La Passion states such as Dos Pilas, Aguateca, Ceibal and Cancuén, c. 760, followed by the Usumacinta system cities of Yaxchilan, Piedras Negras, and Palenque, following a path from south to north.

Toward the end of the late Classic period, the Maya stopped recording the years using the Long Count calendar, and many of their cities were burned and abandoned to the jungle. Meanwhile, in the Southern Highlands, Kaminal Juyú continued its growth until 1200. In Oaxaca, Monte Alban reached its apex c. 750 and finally succumbed toward the end of the 9th century for reasons that are still unclear. Its fate was not much different from that of other cities such as La Quemada in the north and Teotihuacan in the center: it was burned and abandoned. In the last century of the Classic era, hegemony in the valley of Oaxaca passed to Lambityeco, several kilometers to the east.

==== Teotihuacan ====
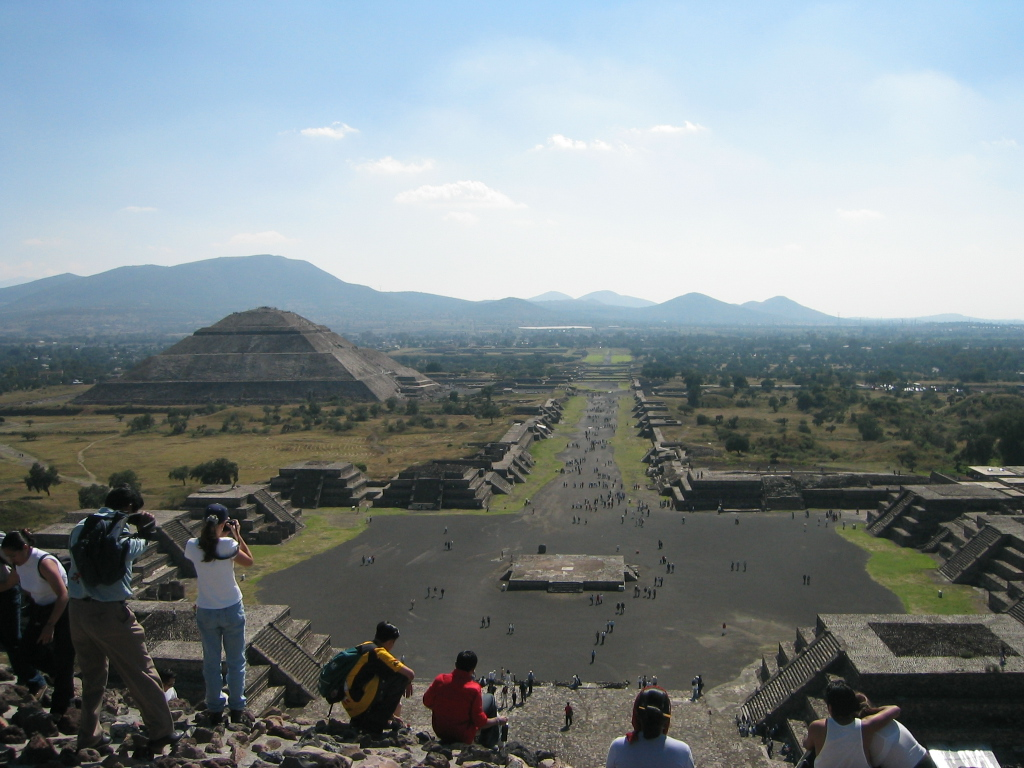
View of the Calzada de los Muertos (Avenue of the Dead) from the Pyramid of the Moon, Teotihuacan, Mexico

Teotihuacan ("The City of the Gods" in Nahuatl) originated toward the end of the Preclassic period, c. 100 CE. Very little is known about its founders, but it is believed that the Otomí had an important role in the city's development, as they did in the ancient culture of the Valley of Mexico, represented by Tlatilco. Teotihuacan initially competed with Cuicuilco for hegemony in the area. In this political and economic battle, Teotihuacan was aided by its control of the obsidian deposits in the Navaja mountains in Hidalgo. The decline of Cuicuilco is still a mystery, but it is known that a large part of the former inhabitants resettled in Teotihuacan some years before the eruption of Xitle, which covered the southern town in lava.

Once free of competition in the area of the Lake of Mexico, Teotihuacan experienced an expansion phase that made it one of the largest cities of its time, not just in Mesoamerica but in the entire world. During this period of growth, it attracted the vast majority of those then living in the Valley of Mexico.

Teotihuacan was completely dependent on agricultural activity, primarily the cultivation of maize, beans, and squash, the Mesoamerican agricultural trinity. However, its political and economic hegemony was based on outside goods for which it enjoyed a monopoly: Anaranjado ceramics, produced in the Poblano–Tlaxcalteca valley, and the mineral deposits of the Hidalgan mountains. Both were highly valued throughout Mesoamerica and were exchanged for luxury merchandise of the highest caliber, from places as far away as New Mexico and Guatemala. Because of this, Teotihuacan became the hub of the Mesoamerican trade network. Its partners were Monte Albán and Tikal in the southeast, Matacapan on the Gulf coast, Altavista in the north, and Tingambato in the west.

Teotihuacan refined the Mesoamerican pantheon of deities, whose origins dated from the time of the Olmec. Of special importance were the worship of Quetzalcoatl and Tláloc, agricultural deities. Trade links promoted the spread of these cults to other Mesoamerican societies, who took and transformed them. It was thought that Teotihuacan society had no knowledge of writing, but as Duverger demonstrates, the writing system of Teotihuacan was extremely pictographic, to the point that writing was confused with drawing.

The fall of Teotihuacan is associated with the emergence of city-states within the confines of the central area of Mexico. It is thought that these were able to flourish due to the decline of Teotihuacan, though events may have occurred in the opposite order: the cities of Cacaxtla, Xochicalco, Teotenango, and El Tajín may have first increased in power and then were able to economically strangle Teotihuacan, trapped as it was in the center of the valley without access to trade routes. This occurred around 600 CE, and even though people continued to live there for another century and a half, the city was eventually destroyed and abandoned by its inhabitants, who took refuge in places such as Culhuacán and Azcapotzalco, on the shores of Lake Texcoco.

==== The Maya in the Classic period ====
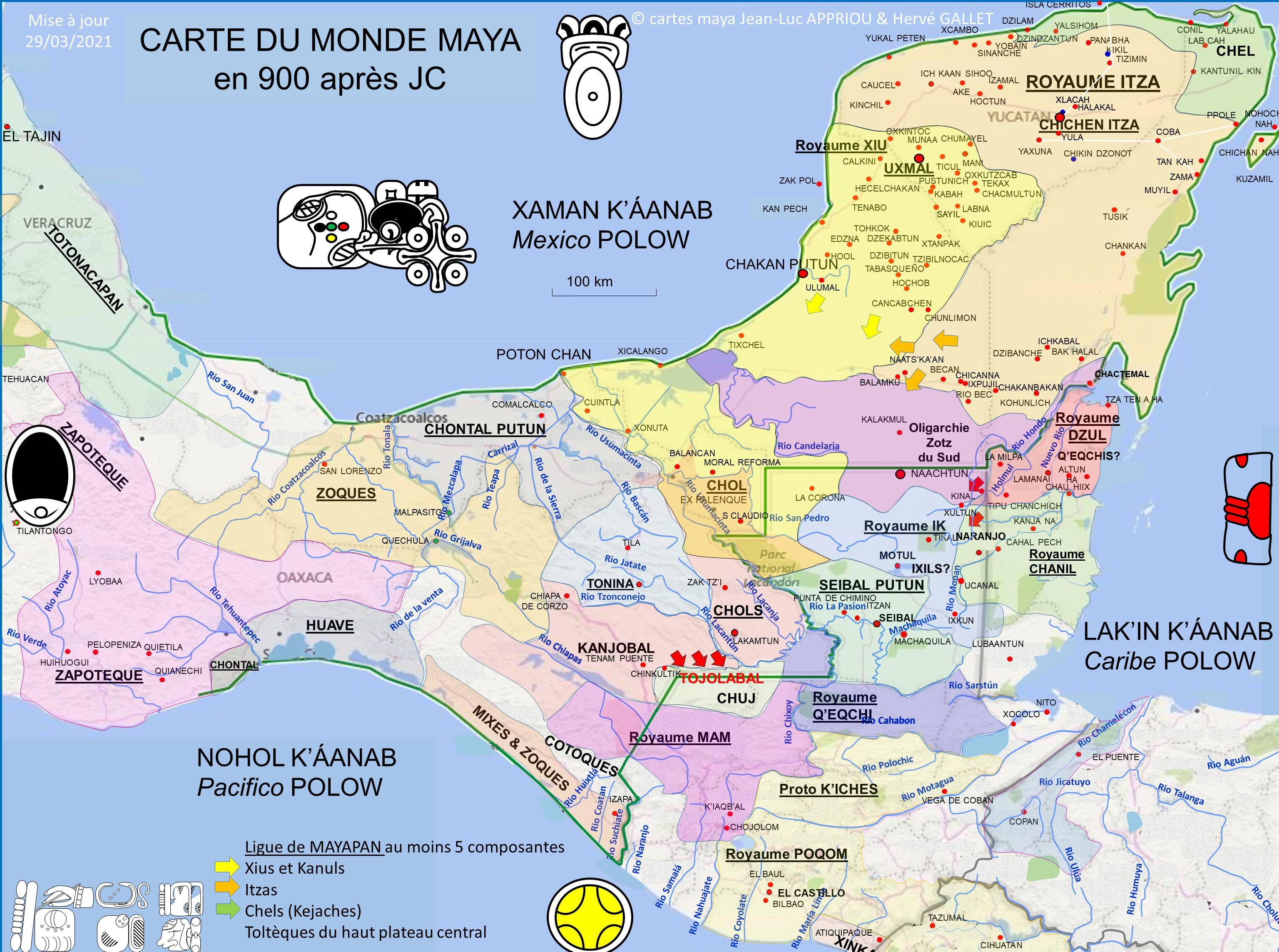
Map of the Maya Region and nearby areas in 900 AD

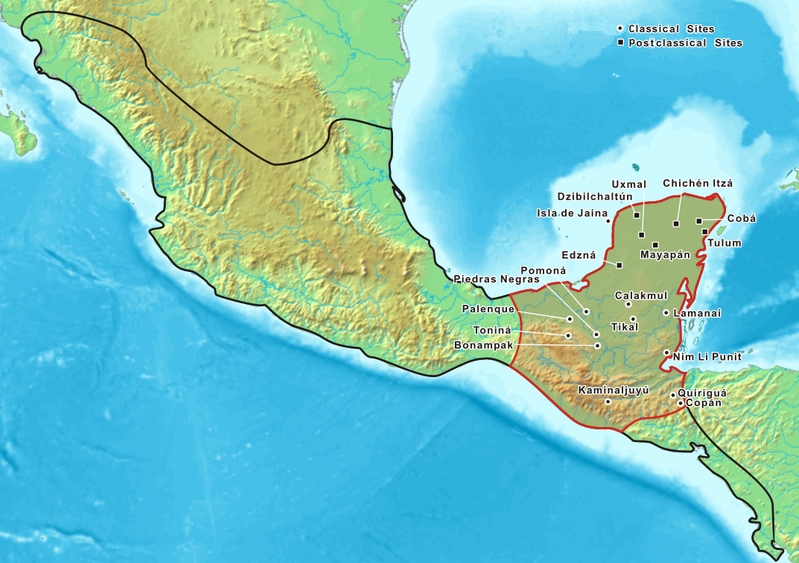
Location of the Maya people and their principal cities

The Maya created one of the most developed and best-known Mesoamerican cultures. Although authors such as Michael D. Coe believe that the Maya culture is completely different from the surrounding cultures, many elements present in Maya culture are shared by the rest of Mesoamerica, including the use of two calendars, the base 20 number system, the cultivation of corn, human sacrifice, and certain myths, such as that of the fifth sun and cultic worship, including that of the Feathered Serpent and the rain god, who in the Yucatec Maya language is called Chaac.

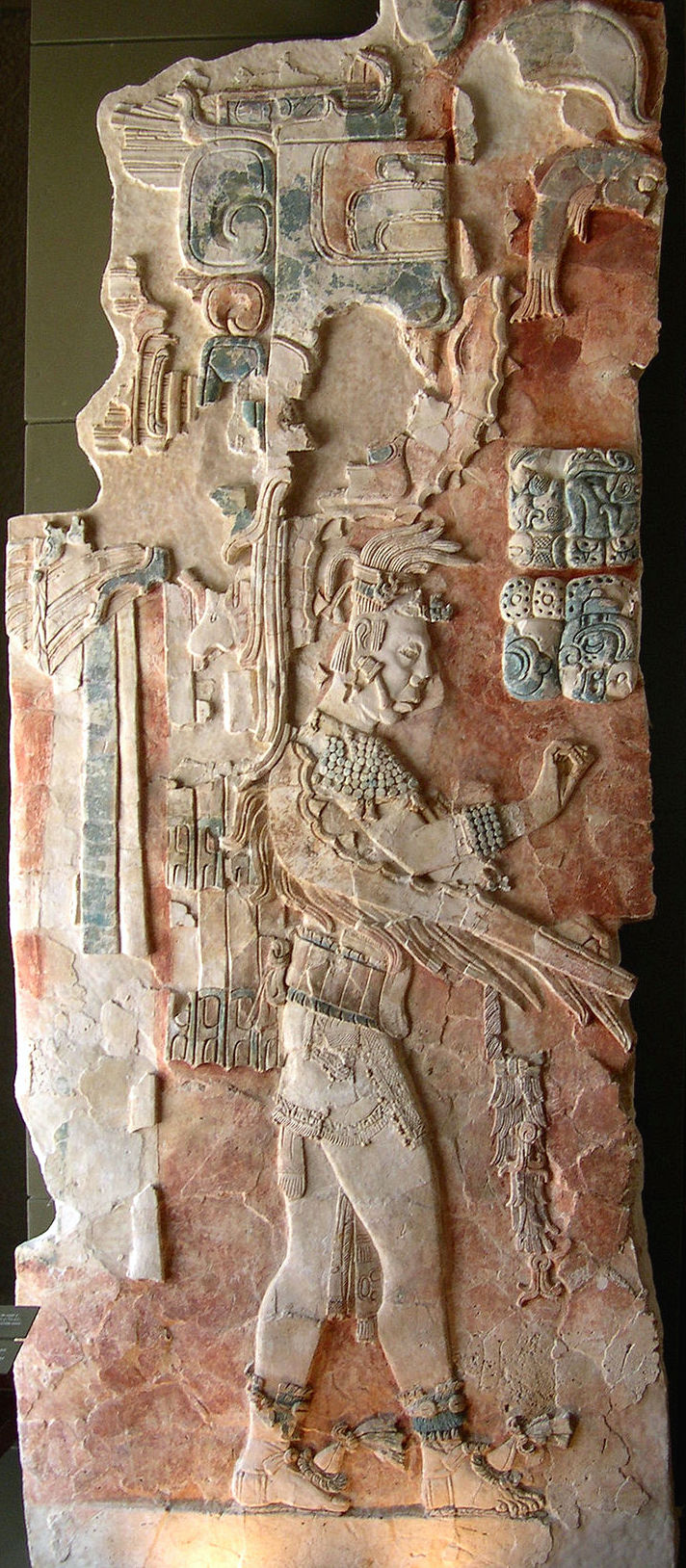
Bas-relief in the museum of Palenque, Chiapas

The beginnings of Maya culture date from the development of Kaminaljuyu, in the Highlands of Guatemala, during the middle Preclassic period. According to Richard D. Hansen and others researchers, the first true political states in Mesoamerica consisted of Takalik Abaj, in the Pacific Lowlands, and the cities of El Mirador, Nakbe, Cival and San Bartolo, among others, in the Mirador Basin and Peten. Archaeologists believe that this development happened centuries later, around the 1st century BCE, but recent research in the Petén basin and Belize have proven them wrong. The archaeological evidence indicates that the Maya never formed a united empire; they were instead organized into small chiefdoms that were constantly at war. López Austin and López Luján have said that the Preclassic Maya were characterized by their bellicose nature. They probably had a greater mastery of the art of war than Teotihuacan, yet the idea that they were a peaceful society given to religious contemplation, which persists to this day, was particularly promoted by early- and mid-20th century Mayanists such as Sylvanus G. Morley and J. Eric S. Thompson. Confirmation that the Maya practiced human sacrifice and ritual cannibalism came much later (e.g. by the murals of Bonampak).

Writing and the Maya calendar were quite early developments in the great Maya cities, c. 1000 BCE, and some of the oldest commemorative monuments are from sites in the Maya region. Archaeologists once thought that the Maya sites functioned only as ceremonial centers and that the common people lived in the surrounding villages. However, more recent excavations indicate the Maya sites enjoyed urban services as extensive as those of Tikal, believed to be as large as 400,000 inhabitants at its peak, circa 750, Copan, and others. Drainage, aqueducts, and pavement, or Sakbe, meaning "white road", united major centers since the Preclassic. The construction of these sites was carried out on the basis of a highly stratified society, dominated by the noble class, who at the same time were the political, military, and religious elite.

The elite controlled agriculture, practiced by means of mixed systems of ground-clearing, and intensive platforms around the cities. As in the rest of Mesoamerica, they imposed on the lowest classes taxes—in kind or in labor—that permitted them to concentrate sufficient resources for the construction of public monuments, which legitimized the power of the elites and the social hierarchy. During the Early Classic Period, c. 370, the Maya political elite sustained strong ties to Teotihuacan, and it is possible that Tikal may have been an important ally of Teotihuacan that controlled commerce with the Gulf coast and highlands. Finally, it seems the great drought that ravaged Central America in the 9th century, internal wars, ecological disasters, and famine destroyed the Maya political system, which led to popular uprisings and the defeat of the dominant political groups. Many cities were abandoned, remaining unknown until the 19th century, when descendants of the Maya led a group of European and American archaeologists to these cities, which had been swallowed over the centuries by the jungle.

=== Postclassic period ===
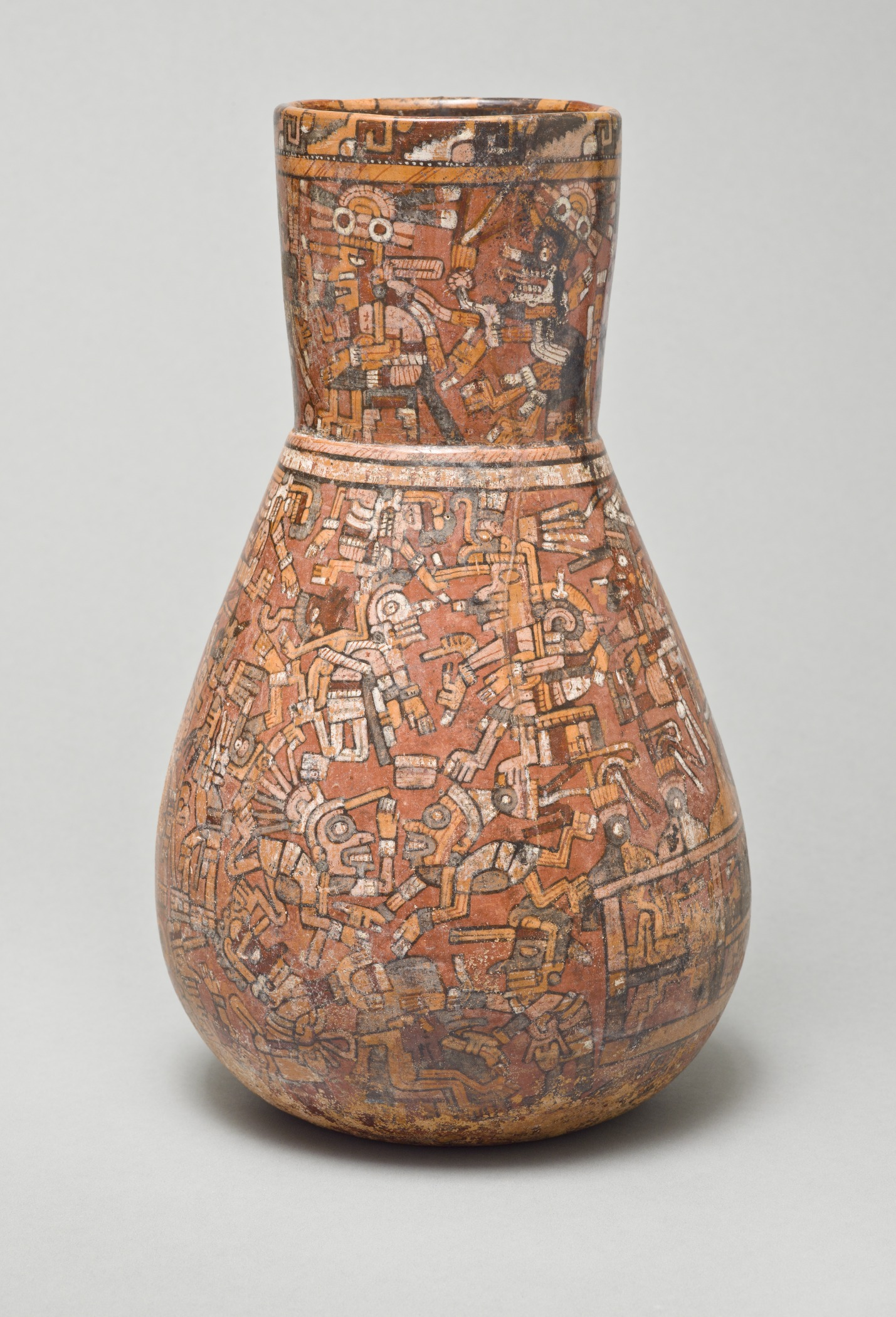
Codex vessel of the Aztatlan culture of Nayarit, in the LACMA

The Postclassic period is the time between the year 900 and the conquest of Mesoamerica by the Spaniards, which occurred between 1521 and 1697. It was a period in which military activity became of great importance. The political elites associated with the priestly class were relieved of power by groups of warriors. In turn, at least a half-century before the arrival of the Spaniards, the warrior class was yielding its positions of privilege to a very powerful group that was unconnected to the nobility: the pochtecas, merchants who obtained great political power by virtue of their economic power.

The Postclassic period is divided into two phases. The first is the early Postclassic, which includes the 10th to the 13th century, and is characterized by the Toltec hegemony of Tula. The 12th century marks the beginning of the late Postclassic period, which begins with the arrival of the Chichimec, linguistically related to the Toltecs and the Mexica, who established themselves in the Valley of Mexico in 1325, following a two-century pilgrimage from Aztlán, the exact location of which is unknown. Many of the social changes of this final period of Mesoamerican civilization are related to the migratory movements of the northern peoples. These peoples came from Oasisamerica, Aridoamerica, and the northern region of Mesoamerica, driven by climate changes that threatened their survival. The migrations from the north caused, in turn, the displacement of peoples who had been rooted in Mesoamerica for centuries; some of them left for Centroamerica.

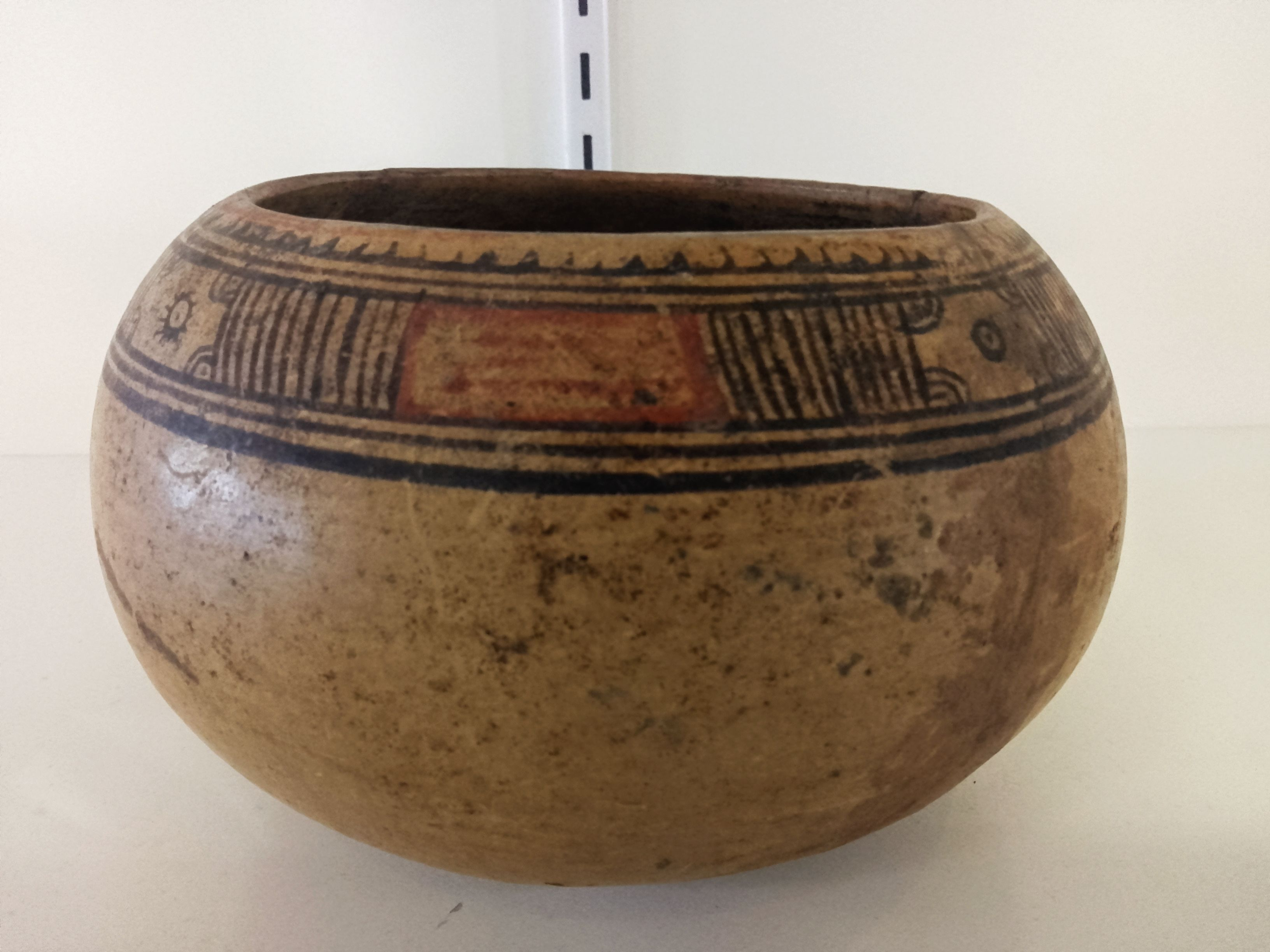
A Chorortega ceramic, one of the southernmost Mesoamerican ethnic groups during the post Classic.

There were many cultural changes during that time. One of them was the expansion of metallurgy, imported from South America, and whose oldest remnants in Mesoamerica come from the West, as is the case also with ceramics. The Mesoamericans did not achieve great facility with metals; in fact, their use was rather limited (a few copper axes, needles, and above all jewelry). The most advanced techniques of Mesoamerican metallurgy were developed by the Mixtec, who produced fine, exquisitely handcrafted articles. Remarkable advances were made in architecture as well. The use of nails in architecture was introduced to support the sidings of the temples, the mortar was improved, and the use of columns and stone roofs was widespread—something that only the Maya had used during the Classic period. In agriculture, the system of irrigation became more complex; in the Valley of Mexico especially, chinampas were used extensively by the Mexica, who built a city of 200,000 around them.

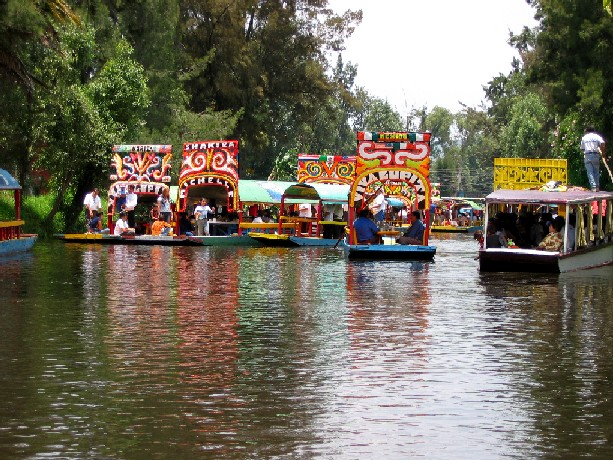
Present day view of the chinampas of Xochimilco, in the Federal District

The political system also underwent important changes. During the early Postclassic period, the warlike political elites legitimized their position by means of their adherence to a complex set of religious beliefs that López Austin called zuyuanidad. According to this system, the ruling classes proclaimed themselves the descendants of Quetzalcoatl, the Plumed Serpent, one of the creative forces, and a cultural hero in Mesoamerican mythology. They likewise declared themselves the heirs of a no less mythical city, called Tollan in Nahuatl, and Zuyuá in Maya (from which López Austin derives the name for the belief system). Many of the important capitals of the time identified themselves with this name (for example, Tollan Xicocotitlan, Tollan Chollollan, Tollan Teotihuacan). The Tollan of myth was for a long time identified with Tula, in Hidalgo state, but Enrique Florescano and López Austin have claimed that this has no basis. Florescano states that the mythical Tollan was Teotihuacan; López Austin argues that Tollan was simply a product of the Mesoamerican religious imagination. Another feature of the zuyuano system was the formation of alliances with other city-states that were controlled by groups having the same ideology; such was the case with the League of Mayapan in Yucatán, and the Mixtec confederation of Lord Eight Deer, based in the mountains of Oaxaca. These early Postclassic societies can be characterized by their military nature and multi-ethnic populations.

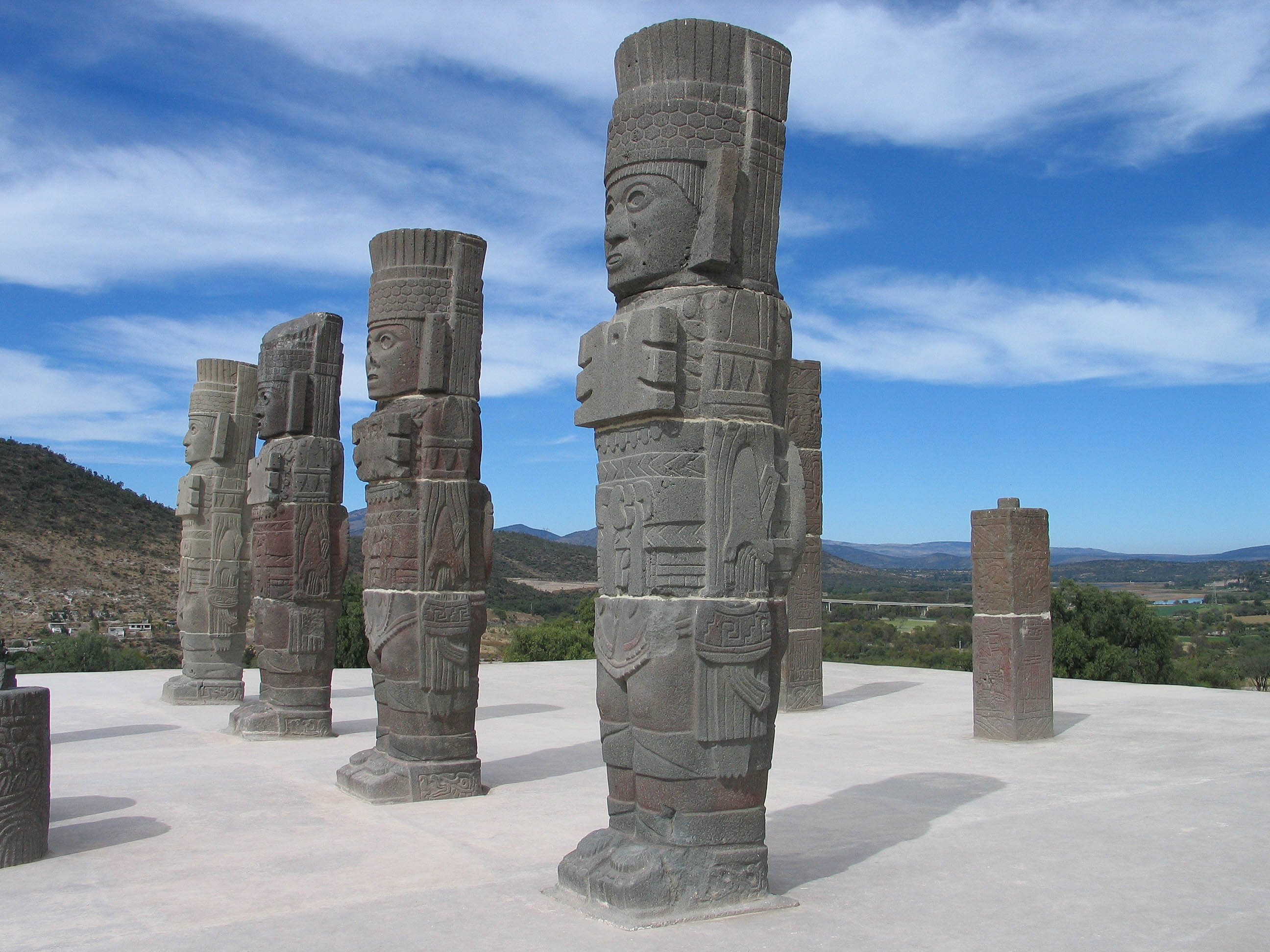
Pillars of Tula, in Hidalgo

However, the fall of Tula checked the power of the zuyuano system, which finally broke down with the dissolution of the League of Mayapán, the Mixtec state, and the abandonment of Tula. Mesoamerica received new immigrants from the north, and although these groups were related to the ancient Toltecs, they had a completely different ideology than the existing residents. The final arrivals were the Mexica, who established themselves on a small island on Lake Texcoco under the dominion of the Texpanecs of Azcapotzalco. This group would, in the following decades, conquer a large part of Mesoamerica, creating a united and centralized state whose only rivals were the Purépecha Empire of Michoacán. Neither one of them could defeat the other, and it seems that a type of non-aggression pact was established between the two peoples. When the Spaniards arrived many of the peoples controlled by the Mexica no longer wished to continue under their rule. Therefore, they took advantage of the opportunity presented by the Europeans, agreeing to support them, thinking that in return they would gain their freedom, and not knowing that this would lead to the subjugation of all of the Mesoamerican world.

==== Aztec ====
Mesoamerican and Central America in the 16th century before the arrival of the Spanish.

Of all prehispanic Mesoamerican cultures, the best-known is the Mexica of the city-state of Tenochtitlan, also known as the Aztecs. The Aztec Empire dominated central Mexico for close to a century before the Spanish conquest of the Aztec Empire (1519–1521).

The Mexica people came from the north or the west of Mesoamerica. The Nayaritas believed that the mythic Aztlán was located on the island of Mexcaltitán. Some hypothesize that this mythical island could have been located somewhere in the state of the Zacatecas, and it has even been proposed that it was as far north as New Mexico. Whatever the case, they were probably not far removed from the classic Mesoamerican tradition. In fact, they shared many characteristics with the people of central Mesoamerica. The Mexicas spoke Nahuatl, the same language spoken by the Toltecs and the Chichimecs who came before them.

The date of the departure from Aztlán is debated, with suggested dates of 1064, 1111, and 1168. After much wandering, the Mexicas arrived at the basin of the Valley of Mexico in the 14th century. They established themselves at various points along the bank of the river (for example, Culhuacán and Tizapán), before settling on the Islet of Mexico, protected by Tezozómoc, king of the Texpanecas. The city of Tenochtitlan was founded in 1325 as an ally of Azcapotzalco, but less than a century later, in 1430, the Mexicas joined with Texcoco and Tlacopan to wage war against Azcapotzalco and emerged victoriously. This gave birth to the Triple Alliance that replaced the ancient confederation ruled by the Tecpanecas (which included Coatlinchan and Culhuacán).

In the earliest days of the Triple Alliance, the Mexica initiated an expansionist phase that led them to control a good part of Mesoamerica. During this time only a few regions retained their independence: Tlaxcala (Nahua), Meztitlán (Otomí), Teotitlán del Camino (Cuicatec), Tututepec (Mixtec), Tehuantepec (Zapotec), and the northwest (ruled at that time by their rivals, the Tarascans). The provinces controlled by the Triple Alliance were forced to pay a tribute to Tenochtitlan; these payments are recorded in another codex known as the Matrícula de Los tributos (Registry of Tribute). This document specifies the quantity and type of every item that each province had to pay to the Mexicas.

The Mexica state was conquered by the Spanish forces of Hernán Cortés and their Tlaxcalan and Totonac allies in 1521. The defeat of Mesoamerica was complete when, in 1697, Tayasal was burned and razed by the Spanish.

== Postconquest era ==
=== Colonial Period, 1521–1821 ===
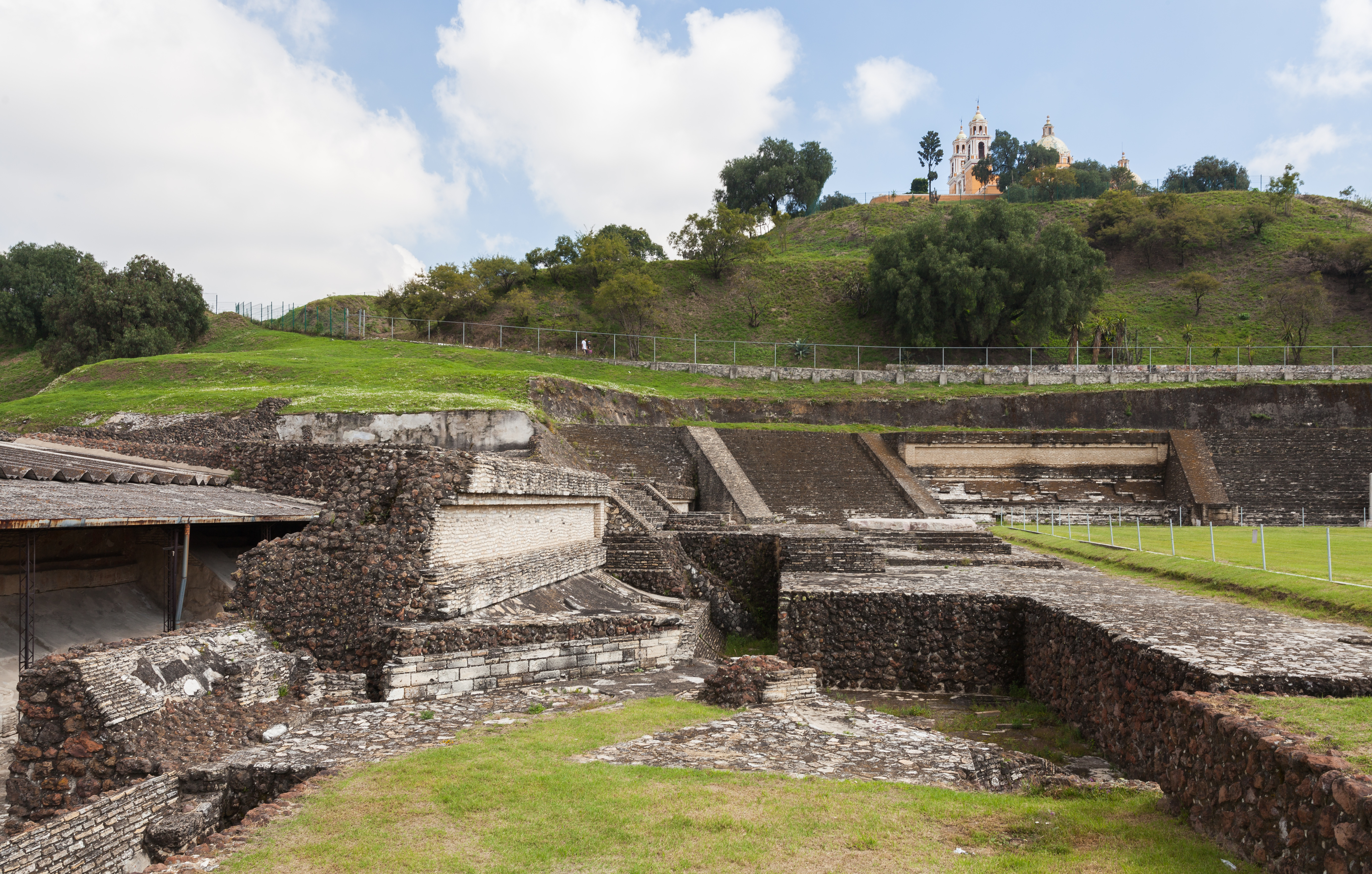
A church on the top of the Cholula pyramid.

With the destruction of the superstructure of the Aztec Empire in 1521, central Mexico was brought under the control of the Spanish Empire. Over the course of the succeeding decades, virtually all of Mesoamerica was brought under Spanish control, which resulted in a fairly uniform policies toward indigenous populations. Spaniards' established the fallen Aztec capital of Tenochtitlan as Mexico City, the seat of government for the Viceroyalty of New Spain. The great initial project for Spanish conquerors was converting the indigenous peoples to Christianity, the only permitted religion. This endeavor was undertaken by Franciscan, Dominican, and Augustinian friars immediately after conquest. Divvying up of the spoils of the war was of key interest to the Spanish conquerors. The major ongoing benefit to conquerors after the obvious material plunder was to appropriate the existing system of tribute and obligatory labor to the Spanish victors.

This was done by the establishment of the encomienda, which awarded the tribute and labor from individual indigenous polities to particular Spanish conquerors. In that way, the economic and political arrangements at the level of the indigenous community were largely kept intact. The indigenous polity (altepetl) in the Nahua area, cah in the Maya region was the key to cultural survival of indigenous under Spanish rule, while at the same time also providing the structure for their economic exploitation. Spaniards classified all indigenous peoples as "Indians" (indios), a term that the indigenous peoples never embraced. They were classified legally as being under the jurisdiction of the República de Indios. They were legally separated from the República de Españoles, which comprised Europeans, Africans, and mixed-race castas. In general, indigenous communities in Mesoamerica kept much of their prehispanic social and political structures, with indigenous elites continuing to function as leaders in their communities. These elites acted as intermediaries with the Spanish crown, so long as they remained loyal. There were significant changes in Mesoamerican communities during the colonial era, but during the colonial period Mesoamericans were the single largest non-Hispanic group in Mexico, far larger than any other group. Although the Spanish colonial system imposed many changes on Mesoamerican peoples, they did not force the acquisition of Spanish and Mesoamerican languages continued to flourish to the present day.

=== Postcolonial Period, 1821–present ===
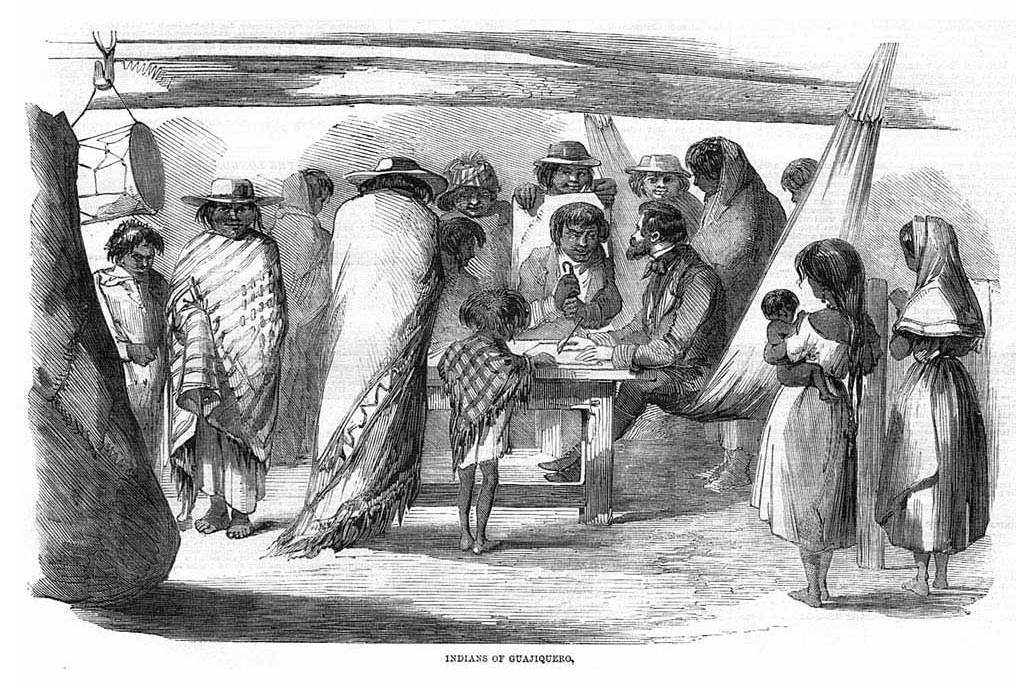
A lithograph from 1859 depicting several indigenous Lenca people in Guajiquiro, Honduras

Mexico and Central America became independent from Spain in 1821, with some participation of indigenous in decade-long political struggles, but for their own motivations. With the fall of colonial government, the Mexican state abolished distinctions between ethnic groups, that is the separate governance for indigenous populations in the República de Indios. The new sovereign country made, in theory at least, all Mexicans citizens of the independent nation-state rather than vassals of the Spanish crown, with different legal standing. A long period of political chaos in the post-independence period among white elites largely did not affect indigenous peoples and their communities. Mexican conservatives were largely in charge of the national government and kept in place practices from the old colonial order.

However, in the 1850s, Mexican liberals gained power and attempted to formulate and implement reforms that did affect indigenous communities, as well as the Catholic Church. The Mexican Constitution of 1857 abolished the ability of corporations to hold land, which aimed at taking assets out of the hands of the Catholic Church in Mexico and forcing indigenous communities to divide their community-held lands. Liberals' aimed at turning indigenous community members pursuing subsistence farming into yeoman farmers holding their own land. Mexican conservatives repudiated the liberal reform laws since they attacked the Catholic Church, but indigenous communities also participated in a three-year civil war.

In the late nineteenth century, liberal army general Porfirio Díaz, a Mestizo did much for modernizing Mexico and integrating it into the world economy, but there were renewed pressures on indigenous communities and their lands. These exploded in certain areas of Mexico during the ten-year long civil war, the Mexican Revolution (1910–1920). In the aftermath of the Revolution, the Mexican government attempted simultaneously shore up indigenous culture, while at the same time also attempting to integrate the indigenous as citizens of the nation, turning indigenous into peasants (campesinos). This has proved more difficult than policy planners imagined, with resilient indigenous communities continuing to struggle for rights within the nation.

== See also ==
Historiography

- List of archaeological periods (Mesoamerica)
- Periodisation of Belizean history
- Periodization of pre-Columbian Peru
- List of pre-Columbian civilizations

History

- Regional communications in ancient Mesoamerica
- History of Central America, the colonial to post-colonial period
- History of the west coast of North America
- Spanish conquest of the Aztec Empire
- Spanish conquest of Yucatán

== Bibliography ==
- Adams, Richard E. W. (2000). "Introduction to a Survey of the Native Prehistoric Cultures of Mesoamerica". The Cambridge History of the Native Peoples of the Americas. 2: 1–44. ISBN 0-521-35165-0.
- Altman, Ida; et al. (2003). The Early History of Greater Mexico. Prentice Hall. ISBN 0-13-091543-2.
- Anderson, Arthur J. O. (1950–82). Florentine Codex: General History of the Things of New Spain (13 vols. in 12 ed.). Santa Fe: School of American Research. ISBN 0-87480-082-X.
- Carmack, Robert; et al. (1996). The legacy of Mesoamerica: history and culture of a Native American civilization. Prentice Hall. ISBN 0-13-337445-9.
- Cline, Sarah (2000). "Native Peoples of Colonial Central Mexico". The Cambridge History of the Native Peoples of the Americas. 2: 187–222. ISBN 0-521-65204-9.
- Coe, Michael D. (1996). Mexico: from the Olmecs to the Aztecs. New York: Thames and Hudson. ISBN 0-500-27722-2.
- Cowgill, George L. (2000). "The Central Mexican Highlands from the Rise of Teotihuacan to the Decline of Tula". The Cambridge History of the Native Peoples of the Americas. 2: 250–317. ISBN 0-521-35165-0.
- Duverger, Christian (1999): Mesoamérica, arte y antropología. CONACULTA-Landucci Editores. Paris.
- Fernández, Tomás; Jorge Belarmino (2003). La escultura prehispánica de mesoamérica. Barcelona: Lunwerg Editores. ISBN 84-9785-012-2.
- de la Fuente, Beatrice (2001). De Mesoamérica a la Nueva España. Oviedo, Spain: Consejo de Comunidades Asturianas. ISBN 84-505-9611-4.
- Gamio, Manuel (1922). La Población del Valle de Teotihuacán: Representativa de las que Habitan las Regiones Rurales del Distrito Federal y de los Estados de Hidalgo, Puebla, México y Tlaxcala (2 vols. in 3 ed.). Mexico City: Talleres Gráficos de la Secretaría de Educación Pública.
- Grove, David G. (2000). "The Preclassic Societies of the Central Highlands of Mesoamerica". The Cambridge History of the Native Peoples of the Americas. 2: 122–155. ISBN 0-521-35165-0.
- Grove, David G. (2001). "Mesoamerican Chronology: Formative (Preclassic) Period (2000 BCE–250 CE)". The Oxford Encyclopedia of Mesoamerican Culture. 2: 236–243. ISBN 0-19-510815-9.
- Jones, Grant D. (2000). "The Lowland Maya from the Conquest to the Present". The Cambridge History of the Native Peoples of the Americas. 2: 346–391. ISBN 0-521-65204-9.
- Kirchhoff, Paul (1943). "Mesoamérica. Sus Límites Geográficos, Composición Étnica y Caracteres Culturales". Acta Americana. 1 (1): 92–107.
- Kuehne Heyder, Nicola; Joaquín Muñoz Mendoza (2001). Mesoamérica: acercamiento a una historia. Granda, Spain: Diputación Provincial de Granada. ISBN 84-7807-008-7.
- López Austin, Alfredo; Leonardo López Luján (1996). El pasado indígena. Mexico: El Colegio de México. ISBN 968-16-4890-0.
- López Austin, Alfredo; Leonardo López Luján (1999). Mito y realidad de Zuyuá: Serpiente emplumada y las transformaciones mesoamericanas del clásico al posclásico. Mexico: COLMEX & FCE. ISBN 968-16-5889-2.
- Lovell, W. George (2000). "The Highland Maya". The Cambridge History of the Native Peoples of the Americas. 2: 392–444. ISBN 0-521-65204-9.
- Luján Muñoz, Jorge; Chinchilla Aguilar, Ernesto; Zilbermann de Luján, Maria Cristina; Herrarte, Alberto; Contreras, J. Daniel. (1996) Historia General de Guatemala. ISBN 84-88622-07-4.
- MacLeod, Murdo J. (2000). "Mesoamerica since the Spanish Invasion: An Overview". The Cambridge History of the Native Peoples of the Americas. 2: 1–43. ISBN 0-521-65204-9.
- MacNeish, Richard S. (2001). "Mesoamerican Chronology: Early Development and the Archaic Period (before 2600 BCE)". The Oxford Encyclopedia of Mesoamerican Culture. 2: 226–236. ISBN 0-19-510815-9.
- Marcus, Joyce; Kent V. Flannery (2000). "Cultural Evolution in Oaxaca: The Origins of the Zapotec and Mixtec Civilizations". The Cambridge History of the Native Peoples of the Americas. 2: 358–406. ISBN 0-521-35165-0.
- McCafferty, Geoffrey G.; David Carrasco (2001). "Mesoamerican Chronology: Classic Period (250-900)". The Oxford Encyclopedia of Mesoamerican Culture. 2: 243–248. ISBN 0-19-510815-9.
- Mendoza, Ruben G. (2001). "Mesoamerican Chronology: Periodization". The Oxford Encyclopedia of Mesoamerican Culture. 2: 222–226. ISBN 0-19-510815-9.
- Miller, Mary Ellen. (2001). El arte de mesoamérica. "Colecciones El mundo del arte". Ediciones Destino. Barcelona, España. ISBN 84-233-3095-8.
- Palerm, Ángel (1972). Agricultura y civilización en Mesoamérica. Mexico: Secretaría de Educación Pública. ISBN 968-13-0994-4.
- Ramírez, Felipe (2009). "La Altiplanicie Central, del Preclásico al Epiclásico"/en El México Antiguo. De Tehuantepec a Baja California/Pablo Escalante Gonzalbo (coordinador)/CIDE-FCE/México.
- Schryer, Frans S. (2000). "Native Peoples of Colonial Central Mexico since Independence". The Cambridge History of the Native Peoples of the Americas. 2: 223–273. ISBN 0-521-65204-9.
- Smith, Michael E. (2001). "Mesoamerican Chronology: Postclassic Period (900–1521)". The Oxford Encyclopedia of Mesoamerican Culture. 2: 248–257. ISBN 0-19-510815-9.
- Sharer, Robert J. (2000). "the Maya Highlands and the Adjacent Pacific Coast". The Cambridge History of the Native Peoples of the Americas. 2: 449–499. ISBN 0-521-35165-0.
- Taylor, William B. (2001). "Mesoamerican Chronology: Colonial Period (1521–1821)". The Oxford Encyclopedia of Mesoamerican Culture. 2: 257–264. ISBN 0-19-510815-9.
- Tutino, John (2001). "Mesoamerican Chronology: Postcolonial Period (1821–present)". The Oxford Encyclopedia of Mesoamerican Culture. 2: 264–271. ISBN 0-19-510815-9.
- Van Young, Eric (2000). "The Indigenous Peoples of Western Mexico from the Spanish Invasion to the Present". The Cambridge History of the Native Peoples of the Americas. 2: 136–186. ISBN 0-521-65204-9.
- Wauchope, Robert, ed. (1964–76). Handbook of Middle American Indians (16 vols. ed.). Austin: University of Texas Press. ISBN 0-292-78419-8.
- Weaver, Muriel Porter (1993). The Aztecs, Maya, and Their Predecessors: Archaeology of Mesoamerica (3rd ed.). San Diego: Academic Press. ISBN 0-01-263999-0.
- West, Robert C.; John P. Augelli (1989). Middle America: Its Lands and Peoples (3rd ed.). Englewood Cliffs, N.J.: Prentice Hall. ISBN 0-13-582271-8.
- Zeitlin, Robert N.; Judith Zeitlin (2000). "The Paleoindian and Archaic Cultures of Mesoamerica". The Cambridge History of the Native Peoples of the Americas. 2: 45–122. ISBN 0-521-35165-0.
